The planetary systems of stars other than the Sun and the Solar System are a staple element in many works of the science fiction genre.

Overview

The notion that there might be inhabited extrasolar planets can be traced at least as far back as Giordano Bruno who, in his De l'infinito, universo e mondi (On the Infinite, Universe and Worlds, 1584), declared that "There are then innumerable suns, and an infinite number of earths revolve around those suns, [These worlds are inhabited] if not exactly as our own, and if not more nobly, at least no less inhabited and no less nobly." Allusions to inhabitants of other stars' planetary systems remained rare in literature for some centuries thereafter. One of these is found in Voltaire's Micromégas (1752), which features a traveller from Sirius.

As science fiction became established in the early 20th century, destinations such as the Moon, Mars, Venus, and other bodies within the Solar System began to seem stale. Authors invoked a variety of mechanisms for superluminal travel (or generation starships) and placed their stories on worlds in planetary systems around other stars, an innovation that gave them the freedom to construct exotic fictional planets and themes. This tendency became predominant once the exploration of the Solar System was complete enough to conclusively demonstrate the unlikelihood of any highly developed form of extraterrestrial life here, aside from humans on Earth.

Although some of the stars named in works of science fiction are purely imaginary, many authors and artists have preferred to use the names of real stars that are well known to astronomers, and indeed the lay public, either because they are notably bright in the sky or because they are relatively close to Earth.

Planetary romances
The multiple fictional genres that appear in the list below include films, television serials, interactive games, and print (among others). Of all these, the print medium, specifically novels and novellas, are of note because they are often planetary romances.

Any science fiction tale whose primary venue is a planet and whose plot turns on the nature of the planet can be described as a planetary romance. It is not enough that the story simply be set on a world. For example, James Blish's A Case of Conscience (1958) is set on the planet Lithia, but it is not a planetary romance because the nature or description of this world has little bearing on the story being told. And in the hard science fiction novels by Hal Clement (see 61 Cygni: A Mission of Gravity below) and Robert L. Forward (see Barnard's Star: Rocheworld below), the worlds on which they are set amount to little more than the sum of the physical and logical problems that they illustrate, and that their protagonists solve. In the true planetary romance, the world itself encompasses—and survives—the tale that temporarily illuminates it.

One early practitioner of the planetary romance was Edgar Rice Burroughs, as for example in his Barsoom (Mars) series (1912–1943). However, as with most writers of his era, his settings did not extend beyond the Solar System, and so his work is not found in this article.

General uses of star names
 The Iliad (c. eighth century BC), epic poem attributed to Homer. The Greek poet describes the final approach of the Greeks' shining warrior, Achilles, toward Troy by comparing him to the dazzling star Sirius. 
 Oedipus Rex (c. 429 BC), a play by Sophocles. In Scene IV the Corinthian shepherd describes keeping his flocks alongside those of the Theban shepherd all during three distant summers, "from spring / Till rose Arcturus". He is trying to stimulate the Theban's memory about their long acquaintance before a fateful event: the Theban's entrusting the infant Oedipus to him, to be raised in Corinth, rather than killing the child as instructed by King Laius of Thebes. 
 Metamorphoses (AD 8), Latin narrative poem by Ovid. The Roman poet describes the apotheosis of the murdered Julius Caesar as Caesar's Comet (C/-43 K1), possibly the brightest daylight comet in recorded history: "Kindly Venus, although seen by none, stood in the middle of the Senate-house, and caught from the dying limbs and trunk of her own Caesar his departing soul. She did not give it time so that it could dissolve in air, but bore it quickly up, toward all the stars of heaven; and on the way, she saw it gleam and blaze and set it free. Above the moon it mounted into heaven, leaving behind a long and fiery trail, and as a star it glittered in the sky." 
 Julius Caesar (1599), a play written by William Shakespeare. In Act III, Scene I, Cassius petitions Caesar to reverse a banishment, but Caesar proclaims his steadfastness, comparing himself to the star Polaris: "But I am constant as the northern star, / Of whose true-fix'd and resting quality / There is no fellow in the firmament." 
 "Polaris" (1920), short story by H. P. Lovecraft. The narrator experiences a series of increasingly substantial dreams about Olathoë, a city of marble lying on a plateau between two peaks, with the "malign presence" of Polaris ever watching in the night sky. At the end of the story, he is convinced that his waking life is not real but a dream from which he cannot awaken. 
 Mary Poppins (1934), novel by P. L. Travers. One of Mary Poppins' unusual acquaintances, a personified star Maia, arrives in London to do some Christmas shopping for the "other stars in the Pleiades". 
 Justine (1957), the first volume in Lawrence Durrell's Alexandria Quartet of novels; its fourth paragraph describes the effect of Arcturus, the brightest star in the Northern Celestial Hemisphere, on the narrator's somber ruminations. 
 Clarissa Oakes (1993), Aubrey–Maturin novel (titled The Truelove in the US) written by Patrick O'Brian. Jack Aubrey establishes his ship's longitude in the Pacific Ocean without the aid of a marine chronometer by taking "two beautiful lunar [distance]s (angle readings), the one on Mars, the other on Fomalhaut". 
 "Dream—The Heart of a Star", Chapter 3 of Neil Gaiman's graphic novel The Sandman: Endless Nights (2003). Mizar appears as a female of blue flame. She is the hostess of an assembly of various cosmic entities, and the creator of the palace where they meet.
Super Mario Galaxy features a black Luma with blue eyes named Polari (a reference to Polaris, the north star) who serves as an advisor to Rosalina and shows the observatory map to the player when talked to.
 Devil Survivor 2 features Polaris as a boss. She acts as the Administrator of the Universe, and must be defeated in order to save the world.

List of planetary systems in fiction 
Planetary systems (mostly hypothetical or imaginary) of real stars appearing in fiction are:

36 Ophiuchi
 Dune (1965) and other novels in the Dune universe by Frank Herbert. 36 Ophiuchi B is orbited by the planet Giedi Prime, the homeworld of House Harkonnen. (For a perspective on the constellation Ophiuchus, the ophidian Harkonnens, and their use of the poisons chaumas and chaumurky compare Phi Ophiuchi: The Palace of Love below.)
 Frontier: Elite II (1993) and Frontier: First Encounters (1995), computer games written by David Braben et al. 36 Ophiuchi is a mining system whose population of mineworkers is concentrated on an earthlike moon in orbit around a gas giant.
 Star Carrier: Deep Space (2013) by Ian Douglas. 36 Ophiuchi A is orbited by a proto-garden world dubbed Arianrhod where Earth has a research outpost.
 At the beginning of the fourth episode of Gene Roddenberry's Andromeda, "Angel Dark, Demon Bright", Tyr Anasazi gives Trance Gemini a lesson in slipstream piloting, with Beka Valentine setting the destination for this system calling it a "quick stream from here".

40 (ο2) Eridani (Keid)

 Dune (1965) and other novels in the Dune universe by Frank Herbert. "Eridani A" is orbited by the planet Richese (the fourth planet in orbit). Richese and Ix (q.v.) are "supreme in machine culture"; their devices are commonplace and considered essential throughout the Dune universe, though they sometimes test the limits of the anti-technology proscriptions of the Butlerian Jihad.
 Star Trek (started in 1966). Film, television, and print franchise originated by Gene Roddenberry. The planet Vulcan, homeworld of the Vulcan species, orbits 40 Eridani A. The authorized Star Trek book Star Trek: Star Charts and Roddenberry himself give this location. In addition, Commander Tucker's statement in the Star Trek: Enterprise episode "Home", that Vulcan is "a little over" 16 light years from Earth supports this location, as 40 Eridani A is 16.39 light-years from our own Solar System. The planet's location is confirmed by a map shown in the Star Trek: Discovery episode "Magic to Make the Sanest Man Go Mad".
 In 2300 AD (1986), role-playing game designed by the Game Designers' Workshop, Montana (Spanish: Montaña), a habitable garden world, is the second planet of ο2 Eridani.
 Silicon Dreams trilogy (1986), interactive fiction games published by Firebird in the US and Rainbird in Europe. The first installment takes place within the system, as the colony ship Snowball 9 is on a collision course with one of the suns, possibly 40 Eridani A. The other two installments take place on the fictional planet Eden, also located in this star system.
 In the Star Carrier series of novels by William H. Keith, Jr. (under the pseudonym Ian Douglas), one of the planets in the 40 Eridani A system is a habitable world named Vulcan.
 In the Stars of Eridani, by Matthew Moran, one of the planets in 40 Eridani A is the destination of the first human colony outside of the Sol system. The novel follows the ill-fated colonists and the inter-generational ship that brings them to the star system.
 Project Hail Mary, by Andy Weir, describes a spider-like, rock-covered alien species that originate from a hot, fast-orbiting, massive rocky planet in orbit around 40 Eridani. This fictional planet, called Erid in the novel, shares many of these properties with the real super-Earth 40 Eridani A b detected in 2018, and the author has confirmed that his development of the alien character began with the biological implications of the known traits of the real exoplanet.
 In the Bobiverse series of novels by Dennis E. Taylor 40 Eridani is a habitable system discovered by one of the Von Neuman Self-replicating spacecraft.

47 Ursae Majoris (Chalawan)
 Coyote (2002), trilogy by Allen Steele. Much of the action of the series takes place on Coyote, a fictional habitable moon of 47 Ursae Majoris b, a planet given the name Bear. Altogether, Bear has six fictional satellites—Dog, Hawk, Eagle, Coyote, Snake and Goat—although only Coyote is habitable. 47 Ursae Majoris c is known as Wolf, and there are two fictional terrestrial planets, Fox and Raven, which orbit inward from Bear and Wolf.
 Old Man's War (2005), by John Scalzi. One of the warzones that the main character, John Perry, is deployed to is Colony 622, a fictional terrestrial planet in the 47 Ursae Majoris system. The inhabitants of Colony 622 were found to have been wiped out by an indigenous alien species, which resembled a terrestrial slime mold.
 Spin (2005), by Robert Charles Wilson. Jason briefly mentions it as the nearest star system with another "optically blank planet", a planet with a "spin membrane", orbiting it in roughly a habitable zone.

58 Eridani 
 58 Eridani features as a colonized system known as Bollam's World in M. D. Cooper's Aeon 14 series. The colony ship Intrepid ends up in the system after encountering the phenomenon known as Kaptyen's Streamer.
 The star is a key element in the short story "Omphalos" by American author Ted Chiang.

61 Cygni
 Foundation series (1951–1993), novels by Isaac Asimov. The star system 61 Cygni, in the Sirius Sector, is advanced by Lord Dorwin as a potential site for the planet of origin of the human species.
 Time and Again (1951), novel by Clifford D. Simak. 61 Cygni is a mysterious system whose planets are impossible to approach.
 Mission of Gravity (1953), novel by Hal Clement. The binary 61 Cygni star system is home to the supermassive planet Mesklin, which rotates rapidly and is highly oblate, with a gravity of 3 g at the equator and 700 g at the poles. A human explorer lands at the equator and engages a crew of the intelligent, centipede-like Mesklinites to retrieve vital information from a space probe that has malfunctioned after landing at one of the poles. Although the 61 Cygni binary is known to be the home system of Mesklin, and is often seen in the sky, it is never actually named in the book: 61 Cygni A is always called simply "the sun", while 61 Cygni B, fainter by a full apparent magnitude, bears the Mesklinite name Esstes.
 Andromeda: A Space Age Tale (1959),  novel by Ivan Yefremov. The Earth of the far future is a communist utopia, nonetheless able to send no more than a few infrequent space ships to the nearest star systems, since interstellar travel is limited by the speed of light. One of these near neighbors is 61 Cygni, which has a planet and is also the 16th-closest star to the Sun. Longer range scientific and cultural communication between the great galactic civilizations is maintained by the enormously expensive radio links of the Great Circle. 61 Cygni, under Director of External Relations Zaph Phthet, is the Earth's main correspondent in this hierarchy of contacts.
 Danny Dunn and the Voice from Space (1967), children's book written by Raymond Abrashkin and Jay Williams. A modulated radio signal coming from 61 Cygni turns out to be an encoded pictogram sent by extraterrestrials.
 Star Fleet Technical Manual (1975), fiction reference book by Franz Joseph Schnaubelt. The technical manual depicts the flag and seal of the "United Planets of 61 Cygni", which is identified by secondary Star Trek materials as the location of Tellar, home of the Tellarite species.
 A Little Knowledge (1977), by Michael Bishop. The Cygnostiks from a planet orbiting 61 Cygni are bipedal beings who come to Earth and cause great social upheaval when one of them converts to the state religion. Cygnostiks have two eyes, each with two pupils; one sensitive to the spectrum of the star 61 Cygni A, the other sensitive to the spectrum of its companion 61 Cygni B. (For a depiction of the species see Barlowe's Guide to Extraterrestrials)
 The Jupiter Theft (1977), by Donald Moffitt.  The Cygnans, originally from Cygnus X-1, stole a very large gas giant from the 61 Cygni system (such an object was believed to actually exist at the time of writing) and used it as propulsion to reach the Solar System.  61 Cygni also hosts the home planet of a species of pink, monkey-like intelligent aliens, some of which the Cygnans abducted as zoo exhibits.
 Traveller (1977–present), suite of role-playing games designed by the Game Designers' Workshop. 61 Cygni is the home star of Nusku, a major colony world of strategic importance during the interstellar wars of the 22nd century.
 "Tricentennial" (1977), Hugo award-winning short story by Joe Haldeman. A radio message from 61 Cygni compels scientists to head for the star system on board the Daedalus, a nuclear fusion-propelled spaceship.  See also: Project Daedalus, a British study of interstellar spacecraft design.
 Blake's 7 (1978–1981), television program created by Terry Nation. The region around 61 Cygni, known as the Darkling Zone, is the only volume of space near Earth that has never been surveyed, since it is home to an alien race which is hostile to mankind and has even released a virus at a Terran Federation base, using a piece of space debris as a vector.
 Downbelow Station (1981) and other Alliance-Union universe works, novels by C. J. Cherryh. 61 Cygni is the site of Bryant's Star Station, one of the stations on the "Great Circle" chain of space stations that terminates at Pell Station in the Tau Ceti system.
 Portal (1986), interactive novel by Brad Fregger. In this novel the player, assuming the role of the unnamed astronaut protagonist, returns from a failed 100-year voyage to 61 Cygni to find the Earth devoid of humans.
 Frontier: Elite II (1993) and Frontier: First Encounters (1995), computer games written by David Braben et al. The terraformed Cygnan planet Scott is notorious for its harsh, icy environment. Nonetheless, its sustaining planetwide fishing industry is well supplemented by a thriving ecotourism industry—visitors from nearby mining systems would never otherwise experience an outdoor environment. 61 Cygni is a member of the Federation.
 Revelation Space universe (2000–2018), novels and stories by Alastair Reynolds. 61 Cygni is the home star of the planet Sky's Edge, an earthlike planet in a perpetual state of war between settler families.
 Earth & Beyond (2002–2004), online role-playing game published by Electronic Arts. 61 Cygni is a system in the outskirts of the game universe.
 61 Cygni Ave, the 13th track on Neon Indian's 3rd studio album, Vega Intl. Night School. There is no reference to the constellation other than the title.
 To Sleep in a Sea of Stars (2020), novel by Christopher Paolini. The 61 Cygni system is the location of a number of key events in the novel.

61 Ursae Majoris
 "The Warriors" (1966), Known Space short story by Larry Niven published in the collection The Shape of Space (1969). 61 Ursae Majoris is the star system of the planet Kzin, homeworld of the Kzinti (singular Kzin), a warlike and bloodthirsty race of cat-like aliens in Niven's Known Space series.
 Star Trek (1966–). 61 Ursae Majoris is orbited by the class M planet Archer IV.
 2300 AD (1986), role-playing game designed by the Game Designers' Workshop. Home system of Joi, a habitable garden world that has four ethnic colonies (Azanian, British, German, and Japanese), as well as the free nation of Elysia, a former French colony.
 Mass Effect (2007), videogame published by Microsoft Game Studios. Birth system of the character of Gunnery Chief Ashley Williams.

61 Virginis
Hugo- and Nebula Award-winning science fiction author Ken Liu wrote two short stories about humans travelling on solar sail spacecraft from Earth to the 61 Virginis solar system, entitled "The Waves" and "Mono No Aware". The latter won the 2013 Hugo Award for Best Short Story.
The system features as a destination for human settlement in Alastair Reynolds' Poseidon's Children trilogy.
in the GURPS Transhuman Space roleplaying setting, the system is home to an exoplanet thought to harbor life.
In the video simulation Elite Dangerous by Frontier Developments, the 61 Virginis system is predicted to have at least two high gravity planets without atmosphere. The second of these hosted the SpeedBowl3 free flight tournament 9–10 November 2019 ( game date: 3305-11-09 / 3305-11-10 )

70 Ophiuchi
 Dune (1965) and other novels in the Dune universe by Frank Herbert. Sikun is the third planet from 70 Ophiuchi.
 "Miri" (1966), episode of Star Trek: The Original Series written by Adrian Spies. In the James Blish treatment of this episode, the events take place on a planet in the 70 Ophiuchi star system. This planet is an exact duplicate of the Earth in every detail.
 Starforce: Alpha Centauri (1974), science fiction board game published by Simulation Publications based on a concept by Redmond Simonsen. In this game as well as in the spin-off game StarSoldier, 70 Ophiuchi is the home of the Rame, an advanced, space-faring race.
 The Ophiuchi Hotline (1977), novel by John Varley.  Humanity survives with the aid of a technology derived from information in the Ophiuchi Hotline, a radio signal apparently beamed from the star 70 Ophiuchi.
 Great Space Battles (1979), a Terran Trade Authority book by Stewart Cowley and Charles Herridge. Four planets orbit the binary 70 Ophiuchi. One of these worlds is roughly the size of Mars, with a human-breathable atmosphere and near-Earth gravity; in 2303, human settlers arrived at the planet and named it Drakon's Folly. Much of the planet's flora is edible by humans and the planet is well-suited for Earth crops, but in the early stages of the colonization of Drakon's Folly, enormous indigenous predatory invertebrates that the colonists called Blueworms, claimed the lives of several colonists before the humans improvised mechanized weapons to hunt down the Blueworms.
 Frontier: Elite II (1993) and Frontier: First Encounters (1995), computer games written by David Braben et al. The 70 Ophiuchi system has an economy based on mining and heavy industry, which makes its population (in the hundreds of thousands) uncharacteristically large.
 In the novel Endymion by Dan Simmons it is said that the world known as Mare Infinitus is an aquatic moon of a subjovian planet located in orbit around 70 Ophiuchi A.
 In the Star Carrier series by Ian Douglas 70 Ophiuchi is orbited by an Earthlike planet, Osiris, colonized by humans.  It is overrun by Sh'daar vassal races in the second book, Center of Gravity.  In the fourth book, Deep Space, the America carrier battle group decisively defeats the Sh'daar in orbit of the planet, and allusions are made to possible later ground operations to eliminate Sh'daar ground forces and recolonize the planet.
 In Deathworld 3 (The Horse Barbarians) (1968) by Harry Harrison, Jason dinAlt and 168 Pyrrans in the transport Pugnacious stop for a layover at Transfer Station 70 Ophiuchi on the way from Pyrrus to Felicity. The station is at the L1 point between 70 Ophiuchi A and B.

82 Eridani
In 2011 three Super-Earths were confirmed in orbit around 82 Eridani (HD20794).
 Orbit Unlimited (1961), fix-up novel by Poul Anderson. The novel recounts the colonisation of the planet Rustum, a fictional terrestrial world orbiting 82 Eridani, by a group of refugees from an authoritarian planet Earth. Although habitable, Rustum's atmospheric pressure is so great that only its mountains and high plateaus are suitable for human settlement (compare UV Ceti: A Gift from Earth below, in which the planet Plateau has similar topography and habitability constraints, and San Martin, another such planet in the Trevor's Star system in the Honorverse.). There is confusion about the distinction between 82 Eridani and Epsilon Eridani, which is addressed in the science background section of the Wikipedia article about this novel.
 "He Fell into a Dark Hole" (1973), short story by Jerry Pournelle originally published in Analog science fiction magazine. Ships are mysteriously disappearing on the direct "Alderson" (hyperspace) path from the planet Meiji in the 82 Eridani system to the Earth.
 Enigma (1986), second installment of The Trigon Disunity series of novels by Michael P. Kube-McDowell. The 82 Eridani system is home to a small, primitive human colony called Muschynka.
 Epona (1996), a highly detailed science fiction world that was developed by a team of over 30 scientists, authors and artists from many different countries, was described in the essay Epona by Wolf Read that appeared in Analog Science Fiction and Fact (November 1996). A novelette by G. David Nordley, Fugue on a Sunken Continent, appeared with the article. Epona is a life-bearing world older than the Earth that has a failed carbonate-silicate cycle and a tendency for multi-million year ice ages. These freezes are temporarily reversed by periodic bouts of remnant volcanism from a slowly cooling planetary interior.
 Ark (2009), novel by Stephen Baxter. 82 Eridani is the home sun of an earthlike planet, Earth II, whose significant axial tilt and eccentric orbit produce seasonal variations extreme enough to discourage colonization.
 "Latency" (2010), short story by Simon Petrie originally published in Aurealis magazine. A small team of xenobiologists and geochemists seeks to understand the mysterious, self-regulating algae that is the sole lifeform native to Charis, a terrestrial planet orbiting 82 Eridani.
 The Aliens Colonial Marines Technical Manual states that the corps' second Marine Space Force that of Eridanus is stationed at Happy Days, Helene 215 (82 Eridani II).
 Frozen Edge and Red Blood, Red Sky (2013), novels by Matthew D. Walter, feature a planet named Kresslabahn, home planet of the alien tanakans.  It is depicted as the fourth planet from 82 G. Eridani.
 In Gary Gibson's book Stealing Light(Shoal Sequence), 82 Eridani is the setting for an altercation between Lucas Corso and Bull Northcutt. 
 In M. D. Cooper's Aeon 14 books, 82 Eridani is the destination of the colony ship Intrepid. The system (and one of its terraformed planets) is known as New Eden. The main character in the series, Tanis Richards, eventually reaches 82 Eridani in the series's 4th book, Destiny Lost. 
 Along with five other exoplanets, 82 Eridani e was included in Civilization: Beyond Earths exoplanet DLC as a playable map.
 The novel Guardian of Night (2012) by Tony Daniels takes place in part in the "vicinity of 82 Eridani".
 "The Last Log of the Lachrimosa", short story set in the Revelation Space universe by Alastair Reynolds, originally published by Subterranean Press. The story takes place on a fictional planet, Holda, in the 82 Eridani system.

94 Aquarii
 "Unexpected" (2001), episode of Star Trek: Enterprise written by Rick Berman and Brannon Braga. The episode makes reference to the Fellebian civilization. The fictional reference book Star Trek: Star Charts (2002) depicts 94 Aquarii as a trinary star with two class G components and a class K component. The trinary is orbited by the planet Fellebia.

107 Piscium
Absolution Gap (2003), novel by Alastair Reynolds. 107 Piscium is orbited by the gas giant Haldora which is in turn orbited by the habitable moon Hela, colonized in the 27th century.
Starhawk (2013), novel by Jack McDevitt. 107 Piscium is orbited by the planet Selika, undergoing controversial terraforming operations.

Acamar (θ Eridani)
 The Wounded Sky (1983), Star Trek novel by Diane Duane. The Enterprise sets a course for Acamar before it is overtaken by several Klingon battle-cruisers.
 "The Vengeance Factor" (1989), episode of Star Trek: The Next Generation written by Sam Rolfe. The Enterprise, after finding traces of Acamarian blood at a looted Federation outpost, goes to Acamar III. There they learn of a group of Acamarian nomadic pirates known as the Gatherers.

Achernar (Alpha Eridani)
 Mentioned in The Worm Ouroboros (1922), in Chapter IX: "... Achernar near the meridian bedimming all lesser fires with his pure radiance."
 Tékumel (1940s onwards), novels and games by M. A. R. Barker. 
 The Killing Machine (1964), "Demon Princes" novel by Jack Vance.
 The Eyes of the Overworld (1966), "Dying Earth" novel (retitled Cugel the Clever in the Vance Integral Edition) by Jack Vance.
 Star Wolf (1967–1968), trilogy by Edmond Hamilton. 
 Mindbridge (1976), novel by Joe Haldeman. 
 BattleTech: The Crescent Hawk's Inception (1988).
 Frontier: Elite II (1993), Frontier: First Encounters (1995) and Elite: Dangerous (2014) computer games. Achernar (spelled in-universe as Achenar) is the capital system of the Empire, one of the galaxy's major powers.
 Primortals (1995–1997), comic book series concept.
 Star Trek Nemesis (2002), novel by J. M. Dillard.

Alcor (80 Ursae Majoris)
 Fist of the North Star (1983–88), manga and anime series produced by Buronson and Tetsuo Hara. Alcor is depicted as the Star of Death (lit. 'Death Omen Star'), as it is said that anyone who observes it is fated to die within a year. The star also shines with a particular brightness on the occurrence of a battle between two practitioners of the Hokuto Shinken martial art, illuminating the combatant who will lose the bout.

Aldebaran (Alpha Tauri)
 The Cthulhu Mythos (1921- ), a fictional universe created by H. P. Lovecraft et al. Hastur is a fictional entity in the Mythos, ambiguously referred to as a place, an object, or a deity, and developed into a Great Old One by August Derleth. Robert W. Chambers uses Hastur to represent both a person and a place associated with the names of several stars, including Aldebaran: more particularly, Hastur inhabits the shores of Lake Hali on a planet circling a dark star near Aldebaran.
 Lensman series (1934–48), novels by E. E. "Doc" Smith. The Lensman series takes place over a vast sweep of space and on many different worlds. These include the planets Aldebaran I, occupied by the Wheelmen, and the scene of Kimball Kinnison's first major injury requiring hospitalization (leading to his first meeting with Clarrissa MacDougall), and Aldebaran II, one of the first human-settled planets, and the scene of several of Kinnison's adventures. Smith's work is strongly identified with the beginnings of US pulp science fiction as a separate marketing genre and did much to define its essential territory, galactic space, featuring many planets such as those orbiting Aldebaran.
 The Starmen (1952), a novel by Leigh Brackett. Llyrdis, the fourth planet of Aldebaran, is the home of the starfaring Vardda. The novel is a space opera in which the Vardda are the only race that is able to endure the rigors of interstellar travel. Boucher and McComas gave the novel a lukewarm review, describing it as "an able job of writing a completely routine and uncreative space opera." The book, a prime example of the midcentury shift in science fiction authors' attention away from planets in the Solar System to worlds in orbit around other stars, pales in comparison to Brackett's best single work of the same period, The Long Tomorrow.
 The Lord of the Rings (1954–1955), fantasy epic written by J. R. R. Tolkien. Borgil, which follows Remirrath (the Pleiades) and precedes Menelvagor (Orion) has been convincingly identified as Aldebaran.
 The Stars My Destination (1956), classic science fiction novel (titled Tiger! Tiger! in the UK) written by Alfred Bester. After his apotheosis in the burning cathedral, the legendary Gully Foyle teleports stark naked to the vicinity of several stars, including Aldebaran: "Aldebaran in Taurus, a monstrous red star of a pair of stars whose sixteen planets wove high-velocity ellipses around their gyrating parents." The interstellar "jaunting" sequence is typical of Bester's signature pyrotechnics, his quick successions of hard, bright images, and mingled images of decay and new life.
 The Lathe of Heaven (1971), a novel by Ursula K. Le Guin. Protagonist George Orr, in an alternate-reality Oregon, is an effective dreamer: his dreams have the power to alter reality. Under the guidance of Svengali-like sleep researcher William Haber, he dreams into existence a series of increasingly intolerable alternate worlds: dreaming for "world peace," he creates an alien invasion of Earth's lunar colony Moondome (uniting humanity against the threat). The attackers are "natives of a methane atmosphere planet of the star Aldebaran, [and] had to wear their outlandish turtle-like suits perpetually on Earth or the Moon, but they didn't seem to mind." In the 2008 Prentice paperback, the flying turtle-aliens and their Tauran homeworld are imagined in cover art by Timothy Goodman. Like all of Le Guin's work, Lathe of Heaven is shaped around a recurrent motif—in this case, the balance of the archetypal symbols of arrogance and submission.
 The Lathe of Heaven (1980), PBS television film based on the Ursula K. Le Guin novel The Lathe of Heaven (see Literature section above), film written by Diane English and Roger Swaybill and directed by David Loxton and Fred Barzyk. With Ed Emshwiller on board as its visual consultant, the movie made innovative use of existing reality (futuristic high-rises in Dallas, for instance) to produce a striking "future reality" on a budget of only $250,000.

Algenubi (Epsilon Leonis)
 Tékumel (1940s onwards), novels and games by M. A. R. Barker. Algenubi is the home sun of the Hlutrgú, or Swamp Frogs.

Algol (Beta Persei)

 "Beyond the Wall of Sleep" (1919), short story by H. P. Lovecraft. Algol is the location of the final battle between the "light being" and its interstellar nemesis, a vague "cosmic oppressor". The battle is marked by the appearance of a nova in the night sky near Algol.
 Algol (1920), silent film written by Hans Brennert and Fridel Köhne, and directed by Hans Werckmeister. Known for its futuristic scenography by Walter Reimann, it features Emil Jannings as Robert Herne, a coal miner who encounters an alien from Algol.
 "Neither Brute Nor Human" (1984), a short mystery story by Isaac Asimov in Ellery Queen's Mystery Magazine, April 1984, and collected in Banquets of the Black Widowers. Algol is the solution to a puzzle in which the correct star must be identified.
 Tékumel (1940s onwards), novels and games by M. A. R. Barker. Algol is the home sun of the Tinalíya, or Gnomes.
 The Hitchhiker's Guide to the Galaxy (1979), novel by Douglas Adams. Algol is a subject of the ditty: "Aldebaran's great, okay, / Algol's pretty neat, / Betelgeuse's pretty girls / Will knock you off your feet. / They'll do anything you like / Real fast and then real slow, ..."
 Mekton (1984–1994), role-playing game designed by Mike Pondsmith and published by R. Talsorian Games. The Algol system is one setting for the game, which features Japanese-style mecha.  As described in the game, it differs considerably from reality (being composed of four stars, including a yellow dwarf similar to Sol).
 Phantasy Star original series (1987–1993), role-playing video games and other supplementary media created by Sega. The games are set in the planetary system of Algol, home of the primary antagonist, Dark Falz.
 "Ménage à Troi" (1990) and "Qpid" (1991), episodes of Star Trek: The Next Generation. The episodes feature a civilized alien race called the Algolians.
 Stargonauts (1994) and Bikini Planet (2000), novels by David S. Garnett. Algol is a world ruled by a matriarchal monarchy of intelligent cats.
 It is the subject of the song Algol from the Vintersorg album Cosmic Genesis (2000).
 "Midnight in the Heart of Midlothian" (2009), short story included in the collection Halo: Evolutions and "Prototype" (2010), episode of Halo Legends, both parts of the Halo fictional universe. Algolis is a planet of Algol, attacked by the Covenant Empire and defended by United Nations Space Command marines from the UNSC destroyer Heart of Midlothian in the Battle of Algolis. All Covenant forces perished in the attack.
The Sorrows of Satan (1895), novel by Marie Corelli. Algol is mentioned by Lucio de Rimânez, an alias of Lucifer "Algol,—judged by superstitious folk to be an evil star. I love it chiefly on account of its bad reputation,—it is no doubt much maligned. It may be a cold quarter of hell where weeping spirits sit frozen in ice made of their own congealed tears,—or it may be a preparatory school for Heaven—who knows!"
In Praise of Learning (1975), the star is mentioned in the song "Beautiful as the Moon – Terrible as an Army with Banners" by British avant-rock group Henry Cow.
Problem Children Are Coming from Another World, Aren't They? (2011-2015), a Japanese light novel, manga and anime series written by Tarō Tatsunoko. Algol was a former Demon Lord that was currently held as a gift by the Perseus Community.  The creature took on the appearance of a gorgon and had the ability to petrify living creatures with its gaze as in mythology.
Ra's al Ghul, a major foe of Batman in the DC universe, takes his name from the star.

Alhena (Gamma Geminorum)
 Tékumel (1940s onwards), novels and games by M. A. R. Barker. Alhena is the home sun of the Nyaggá, or Dwellers Below.

Alioth (Epsilon Ursae Majoris)
 Star Trek: Bridge Commander (2002), combat simulation game developed by Totally Games and published by Activision. The "Alioth system" and the "Maelstrom" are the location of the Vesuvi star, whose induced supernova destroys the planet Vesuvi III, leading to interstellar war.
 Frontier: Elite II (1993) and Frontier: First Encounters (1995) and Elite: Dangerous (2014), computer games written by David Braben et al. In Elite II Alioth is a lawless anarchy contested by the game's major powers. In First Encounters the population of Alioth has risen against both powers and formed the Alliance of Independent Systems, governed from Alioth. In Elite: Dangerous Alioth is the capital of the Alliance and headquarters of its Prime Minister.
 The Ship Who Sang (1969) science fiction novel by Anne McCaffrey.  In Chapter 3, "The Ship who Killed", Brainship Helva and her Brawn Kira travel to the bleak volcanic planet Alioth, where a rogue Brainship is being worshiped as the goddess of a death cult.

Alkalurops (Mu Boötis)
 Dune (1965) and other novels in the Dune universe by Frank Herbert. Ix is the ninth planet (hence its name) from the star Alkalurops (named Rodale in the Legends of Dune prequel novels) and is a pre-eminent source of high technology in the Dune universe. The devices manufactured on Ix and Richese (q.v.) are commonplace and considered essential, though they sometimes test the limits of the anti-technology proscriptions of the Butlerian Jihad.

Alnilam (Epsilon Orionis)
 Robinson Crusoe on Mars (1964), film written by John C. Higgins and Ib Melchior based on the novel Robinson Crusoe by Daniel Defoe; directed by Byron Haskin. Alnilam is the home star of the aliens in this movie, including the slave named "Friday" freed by the marooned Earth astronaut.

Alnitak (Zeta Orionis)
 "The City on the Edge of Forever" (1967), episode of Star Trek: The Original Series written by Harlan Ellison. Captain Kirk struggles to recall a book written around 2030 by a famous novelist from "a planet circling that far left star in Orion's Belt".
 Infinity Beach (2000), novel by Jack McDevitt. Alnitak is the location of the first contact between human and alien civilizations.

Alpha Andromedae (Alpheratz) 
 Alpha Andromedae is referred to by the name "Sirrah" in the Ayreon mythology. Universal Migrator (2000) and The Source (2017) feature an alien race abandoning their home planet in search of a new home on "planet Y" orbiting "the star of Sirrah."

Alpha Arietis (Hamal) 
 A Case of Conscience (1953), novel by James Blish. Lithia (Alpha Arietis II) is home to the Lithians, a kangaroo-like species whose life cycle is a perfect example of ontogeny recapitulating phylogeny (their young 'evolve' into adults). Lithians have a non-religious ethical code of conduct and their utopian society has no crime. This causes great problems for a visiting Catholic priest, whose faith is tested by the evidence.  (for a depiction of the species see Barlowe's Guide to Extraterrestrials)

Alpha Centauri (Rigil Kentaurus/Toliman)

 "Foundation" (1942) by Isaac Asimov: Lord Dorwin lists "Alpha Centauri" second among planets speculated as origin of mankind, behind Sirius but ahead of "Sol".
"Foundation and Earth" by Isaac Asimov: Golan Trevize, Janus Pelorat and Blissenobiarella visit Alpha Centauri while trying to find the location of Earth
 "Far Centaurus" (1944), short story by A. E. van Vogt published in the collection Destination: Universe! (1952). A crew of Terran explorers who have been hibernating through a centuries-long voyage to Alpha Centauri discover on arrival that humanity already arrived at the Alphan planet Pelham via superluminal travel long before them (compare Comics: Guardians of the Galaxy below).
 Seed of Light (1959), novel by Edmund Cooper. An elite crew of men and women fleeing Earth after a nuclear holocaust reach the Alpha Centauri system, only to discover—to their vast chagrin—that there are no planets there. Reluctantly, they forge onward.
 Ikarie XB-1 (1963), Czechoslovak science fiction film directed by Jindřich Polák based loosely on the novel The Magellanic Cloud, by Stanisław Lem. The starship Ikarie XB-1 is sent to the mysterious "White Planet" orbiting the star Alpha Centauri. The 40-strong multinational crew must adjust to life in space, as well as dealing with various hazards they encounter during their 28 months long journey.
 The Man-Kzin Wars (1966), Known Space novel by Larry Niven. Wunderland is a planet circling Alpha Centauri, and the location of the first extra-solar colony in the human history of Known Space. A salubrious world with a gravity 60% of Earth normal, it was invaded and its population enslaved for almost half a century by the Kzinti during the first Man-Kzin War. Alpha Centaurian men and women endured, or waged guerrilla warfare from remote and desolate bases, until the liberation.
 In the Star Trek episode "Metamorphosis" (1967), written by Gene L. Coon, Zephram Cochrane (the inventor of warp drive) was said to be from Alpha Centauri. (Later films and series episodes retconned this, having him have been born on Earth and moved to the Alpha Centauri colony in his later years.)
 Lost in Space (1965–1968), television series created by Irwin Allen and variously directed. The astronaut family of Drs. John and Maureen Robinson, accompanied by their pilot Major Donald West and a robot, set out from an overpopulated Earth in the spacecraft Jupiter 2. The crew is frozen in suspended animation for the five-and-a-half year voyage to a known habitable planet of Alpha Centauri, on which they are to establish a colony. The ship is lost in space due to sabotage by an enemy agent, Dr. Zachary Smith, who is trapped aboard the ship at launch. Hurtling on into deep space, the Jupiter 2 crash lands on an unknown planet. Although remote, this lost world soon becomes a stopping-off point for practically every space-travelling alien or monster in the galaxy, each episode seeing the arrival of some new visitor. Several remakes have been released: a 1998 feature film, a 2004 pilot television episode, and a 2018 television series.
 "The Golden Man" (1981), episode of Buck Rogers in the 25th Century (season 2) written by Calvin Clements Sr. and Stephen McPherson and directed by Vincent McEveety. Under the command of Admiral Asimov, the spaceship Searcher enters the asteroid belt of the Alpha Centauri system and becomes trapped on a planetoid by a lethal magnetic storm. The crew comes upon Velis, one of the golden people, humanoids who possess alchemical faculties and age in reverse.  Velis reveals that his companion, Relos, can use special powers to help the ship escape destruction if the crew is willing to rescue him from the prison planet Iris VII orbiting Alpha Centauri.
 Voyage from Yesteryear (1982), novel by James P. Hogan. An automated genetic ark flees imminent nuclear catastrophe on the Earth, and locates a habitable planet in orbit around Alpha Centauri. Hundreds of human ova are programmed from the DNA databanks, then birthed and raised in untrammeled innocence by robotic nannies. As these "natural humans" grow to maturity, they organize the polity of their colony world Chiron as a classless pastoral anarchy. When a resurgent and covetous Earth comes calling, the Chironians "governed according to [a] kind of Trickster Libertarianism ... effortlessly face down and flummox the attempt by Earth to re-establish control." Instead of seizing power, the invaders are happily assimilated.
 In the Transformers franchise (1984), several continuities have established Alpha Centauri as the solar system containing Cybertron, the homeworld of the Transformers.
 In 2300 AD (1986), role-playing game designed by the Game Designers' Workshop. The Alpha Centauri system has a number of habitable worlds: Tirane (Alpha Centauri A I), the first planet of Alpha Centauri A, is a habitable "garden" world where a number of Terran nations each maintain one or more colonies. It was the first habitable extrasolar planet discovered by mankind, and it has grown in importance until it is considered to be one of the core worlds. Sheol (Alpha Centauri B I), the first planet of Alpha Centauri B, is a hothouse world with significant deposits of minerals and a thriving extraction industry. Limbes (Alpha Centauri B III), the third planet of Alpha Centauri B, is a post-garden world, sterilized by the greenhouse effect. Scientists maintain a research station in orbit around this world. Despite almost a century of study, no surviving life forms have been detected, but fossil evidence still bears witness to a rich ecology that long ago perished. Moiroi (Proxima Centauri I) (with its associated satellites: Clotho, Lachesis, and Atropos) is the sole planet of Proxima Centauri. Several nations maintain scientific or mining stations on the moons of this planet.
 Sid Meier's Alpha Centauri (1999), videogame designed by Brian Reynolds, Bing Gordon and Sid Meier. In 2060 the United Nations launch "Unity", a colonization mission directed towards the nearby system of Alpha Centauri, to avoid the ravages of Earth and the hinted imminent demise of civilization (for nuclear warfare, uncontrolled climate change, excessive pollution). Once there, a malfunction causes the colonists to wake up early from their cryo-induced slumber and the star ship to enter collision route with the planet. After the assassination of captain Garland, the crew splits into 7 factions which differ not by ethnicity or nationality but by ideology. The now splinted members of the crew reach the evacuation drop pods to start a colonization attempt which will be not only a quest for the survival of humanity (no radio signals come from the Sun, hinting that the colonists are the last humans) but also for the ultimate ideological lead of mankind. All celestial bodies in the Alpha Centauri system are named after mythological centaurs. The target planet is officially named Chiron, the only non-barbaric centaur in Greek mythology and an important loregiver and teacher for humanity, but the colonists simply call it Planet. The name also pays homage to James P. Hogan's 1982 space opera novel Voyage from Yesteryear, in which a human colony is artificially planted by an automatic probe on a planet later named by colonists as Chiron. It has a mass roughly equivalent to that of Earth, but no axis inclination and therefore no relevant seasonal changes, and two moons: Pholus and Nessus, whose combined tidal forces equal that of the Moon. Its biosphere is dominated by red layers of xenofungus, which forms sentient networks capable of some kind of primitive sapiency. The xenofungus lives in symbiosis with mind worms, which are hostile to colonists (unless social engineering choices and research allow to capture them or even start breeding programs). If the player increases ecological impact through industrial production and pollution, sudden xenofungal blooms and mind worm boils might appear, in a process that one of the faction leaders compared to an "immunitary system reaction" against pathogens. There is another planet that is mentioned, Eurythion, a Mercury-like planet orbiting close to Alpha Centauri A. There are no other planets and since their formation was likely prevented by Alpha Centauri B, the latter is dubbed Hercules, a reference to the Greek hero slaying centaurs in mythology.
 Avatar (2009), film written and directed by James Cameron. The film is set in 2154, when Earth's RDA Corporation is mining a precious mineral called unobtanium on Pandora, a lush habitable moon of the gas giant Polyphemus in the Alpha Centauri A system (see graphic). Pandora, whose atmosphere is poisonous to humans, is inhabited by the Na'vi, 10-foot-tall blue-skinned intelligent humanoids who live in harmony with nature. The film's title Avatar refers to the genetically engineered Na'vi-human hybrid bodies used by a team of researchers to interact with the natives. The expansion of the mining colony threatens the continued existence of a local tribe of the Na'vi, and sympathetic humans use their Avatars to lead them in a revolt against the corporate security forces.
In Remembrance of Earth's Past, the (2008-2010) novel trilogy by Liu Cixin, the three stars of Alpha Centauri form a chaotic system referred to as Trisolaris.

Alpha Ceti (Menkar or Menkab)
 "Space Seed" (1967), episode of Star Trek: The Original Series written by Gene L. Coon and Carey Wilber, and the second Star Trek film Star Trek II: The Wrath of Khan (1982), film written by Jack B. Sowards and directed by Nicholas Meyer. Ceti Alpha V (with twisted Bayer designation) is the planet to which Khan and his crew are exiled in "Space Seed", James Kirk's vain hope in so exiling them being that they can establish a colony, and from which they escape in The Wrath of Khan after it is rendered uninhabitable as a consequence of the destruction of Ceti Alpha VI.
 "Starvin' Marvin in Space" (1999), episode 13 of season 3 of South Park. Alpha Ceti VI is the planet Marklar, whose inhabitants speak a language identical to English except that every noun is replaced with the word "Marklar". The planet is subjected to a controversy when Christian missionaries attempt to proselytize the Marklar.
 "Twilight" (2003), episode of Star Trek: Enterprise written by Mike Sussman. Ceti Alpha V (with twisted Bayer designation) is the home of what is left of Humanity after the Xindi destroy the Earth (along with Mars and multiple extrasolar Human-colonized planets) in an alternate timeline; the "cruel joke", as described by Sussman, that Humankind's new homeworld ("Twilight" takes place 113 years before "Space Seed") was itself doomed, was intentional.

Alpha Coronae Borealis (Alphecca/Alphekka)
 Star Carrier, novel series by William H. Keith, Jr. writing as Ian Douglas. Alien radio transmissions from Alphekka are detected on Earth, leading the Terran Confederation of States to the conclusion that it may be a major Sh'daar base. In the second book, Center of Gravity (2011), Rear Admiral Alexander Koenig is given the go-ahead to launch Operation Crown Arrow and attack the presumed base. They discover a large, automated spaceship factory, defeat the fleet defending it, and destroy the station.
 Star Trek:
 The 1997 Star Trek: The Next Generation novel Intellivore by Diane Duane cites Alphecca IV as the home planet of the Alpheccan civilization, which rarely leaves its home system.
 In the 2002 computer game Star Trek: Starfleet Command III the seventh planet of the Alphecca system, Gemma VII, is a holding of the Romulan Star Empire, and a friendly port for Romulan player characters.

Alpha Draconis (Thuban)
 "That Darn Katz!" (2010), episode of the animated science fiction comedy series Futurama created by Matt Groening. In this episode, it is revealed that the domestic house cat is originally from the planet Thuban IX.
 Mass Effect 2 (2010), role playing game developed by BioWare and published by Electronic Arts. In this game, players can explore the Thuban planetary system.
 Way Station (novel) (1964), in the novel by Clifford D. Simak the protagonist Enoch Wallace entertains a visitor from the liquid planet Thuban IV.

Alpha Gruis (Alnair)
 Starliners: Commercial Travel in 2200 AD (1980), a Terran Trade Authority book by Stewart Cowley. Alpha Gruis has a system of four planets; Alpha Gruis I is the homeworld of the Natans, who are not native to the planet; the Natans were forced to colonize the planet after their colony ship crashed on the world more than 2,500 years beforehand. The Natans are relatively introverted in personality, and only allow a few number of off-world visitors at a time via their spaceline, Magnum Charter, which was founded in 2199.

Alpha Hydri
 Serpent's Reach (1980), novel by C. J. Cherryh. Alpha Hydri III (Cerdin) is the home planet of the Majat, an insectoid race whose inter-hive conflicts drive the novel. The article on Serpent's Reach addresses the difficulty of ascertaining the actual home planet of the Majat based on conflicting evidence found in various parts of the Alliance-Union universe corpus.

Alpha Mensae
 Starliners: Commercial Travel in 2200 AD (1980), a Terran Trade Authority book by Stewart Cowley. Alpha Mensae is orbited by three planets, one of which is Monk's Field, named for Dr. Edward Monk, who led the early 22nd century expedition that colonized the world later named for him. Originally, the planet was mined for its resources, which led to manufacturing, then shipbuilding, which led to the founding of Monk's Field Spaceways in 2172. Monk's Field is also the homeworld of Belton Aerospace, which builds PL 90 starliners for Spaceways (the PL 90 was introduced in 2173, and is well known for its reliability), and the Terran megacorporation Pan Star Enterprises owns several popular orbital resorts in the Alpha Mensae system.
 The Stones From Which Meadows Grow (1998) is a short story by Wolf Read published in Analog Science Fiction and Fact (March 1998). Goliath is a life-bearing planet that circles Alpha Mensae. The planet, amid a highly populated disk of planetesimals and protoplanets, is constantly pummelled by these bolides—hence the world's name. The frequent meteor impacts have critical implications for the indigenous life, and a human research facility located on one of the continents. A child who is fascinated by the impacts makes an important discovery while on a field trip.

Alpha Pavonis (Peacock)
 Star Control II (1992), computer game developed by Toys for Bob and published by Accolade. The planet Alpha Pavonis VII is the site of a crashed Ur-Quan Dreadnought, multiple items scavenged from the wreckage of which play a role in the plot.

Alpha Phoenicis (Ankaa)
 Starliners: Commercial Travel in 2200 AD (1980), a Terran Trade Authority book by Stewart Cowley. Alpha Phoenicis is orbited by four planets, one of which, Alpha Phoenicis II, has a planetary surface that is 86% water, and is called Synakkah Musfor by its highly advanced natives, the Synakkahans, who resemble bipedal lobsters. The Synakkahans are renowned for their advanced medical science, bringing many off-worlders to receive medical treatment; the Synakkahan underwater cities and gardens also attract many tourists. In 2218, they established Synakkah Frynysh spacelines to transport patients and tourists to their planet.

Alpha Trianguli (Mothallah)
 The Romulan Way (1987), Star Trek novel by Diane Duane and Peter Morwood. The Treaty of Alpha Trianguli ends the war between the United Federation of Planets and the recently encountered Romulans, establishing the Romulan Neutral Zone demarcating the border between the Federation and the newly established Romulan Star Empire.

Alpha Tucanae
 Star Control II (1992), computer game developed by Toys for Bob and published by Accolade. Alpha Tucanae I is the homeworld of the Zoq, Fot, and Pik species. The planet's fourth native sapient species, the Zebranky, preyed on the Zoq, Fot, and Pik until the three united to wipe them out. During the course of the game, the planet is attacked and orbitally bombarded by the Kohr-Ah, who will destroy all life on the planet unless the player defeats them in time.

Altair (Alpha Aquilae)
 The Winds of Altair (1983), novel written by Ben Bova. Earth is an old planet, and her masses are running out of resources and time. Jeff Holman has to discover a haven for Earth's suffering millions. Altair VI is one such world, and Holman is determined to terraform this alien planet into one where the human race can survive. "In his nonfiction and fiction alike, Ben Bova makes it clear that survival for the [human] race lies elsewhere than on this planet [Earth] alone..."
 Sunstorm (2005), novel written by Arthur C. Clarke and Stephen Baxter. A giant planet that will plunge into the Sun "with the mass of fifteen Jupiters" has been launched toward the Solar System by the Firstborn intelligences of the Altair system. The Altarians, believing mankind to be a disorderly and profligate race, are determined to stop humanity from wastefully "infecting" the galaxy. At immense cost, the planetary missile has been launched on a collision course with the Solar System, with the intention of triggering a huge solar flare that will sterilize the surface of the Earth, and possibly destroy humankind's ultimate refuge on Mars as well. Although illuminated by a spark of hope at the very end, this generally pessimistic tale marks a striking contrast to Clarke's usual liberal, optimistic view of the probable benefits of technology to the future of the human race.

Antares (Alpha Scorpii)

 Tékumel (1940s onwards), novels and games by M. A. R. Barker. Antares is the home sun of the Shén, or Demon Warriors.
 The Stars My Destination (1956), science fiction novel (titled Tiger! Tiger! in the UK) written by Alfred Bester. After his apotheosis in the burning cathedral, the legendary Gully Foyle teleports stark naked to the vicinity of several stars, including Antares: "encircled by two hundred and fifty planetoids of the size of Mercury, of the climate of Eden".
 In "The Conscience of the King" (1966) and "The Changeling" (1967), episodes of Star Trek: The Original Series, Lt. Uhura sings the romantic song "Beyond Antares", including the stanza "The skies are green and glowing / Where my heart is / Where my heart is / Where ... the scented lunar flower is blooming / Somewhere, beyond the stars / Beyond Antares". These lyrics were written by Gene L. Coon.
 Dray Prescot series (1972–1998), novels by Kenneth Bulmer.  A planet called Kregen orbiting Antares is the setting for this series.
 Alpha Scorpio (1974), children's television series produced by Janes Davern for ABC Television in Victoria, Australia (total of 6 episodes). Two university students are camping at Aireys Inlet near Victoria where they witness an inexplicable series of events. The two soon discover that their pal Mirny, in disguise, is one of a cadre of extraterrestrials that has arrived on the Earth from Antares V. The series' title is a twisted Bayer designation with the genitive scorpii of the constellation name replaced by the zodiacal scorpio, possibly for reasons of familiarity or euphony.
 Superman: Last Son of Krypton (1978), novel written by Elliot S. Maggin. In this treatment of the Superman mythos, the planet Krypton revolves around Antares (which herein is named Rao).
 Star Trek II: The Wrath of Khan (1982), film written by Jack B. Sowards and directed by Nicholas Meyer. Khan paraphrases Captain Ahab (from Moby Dick by Herman Melville) when he says that he will chase Admiral Kirk "around the ... Antares Maelstrom".
 Antares Dawn (1986), first of the Antares Series of novels by Michael McCollum. A future human society, built on interstellar travel via "foldspace lines", is threatened when Antares goes supernova.
 Out of This World (1987–1991), TV series created by Bob Booker. Half-Terran teenager Evie Garland (Maureen Flannigan) has a small set of extraterrestrial powers inherited from her father Troy (voice of Burt Reynolds), an emissary from the world of Antares Prime. 
 Invasion of the Turtle Snatchers (1989), episode of the 1987 Teenage Mutant Ninja Turtles animated television series. The Earth is visited by a family from a fictional planet orbiting Antares. They call themselves "Antarians", and dislike violence.
 Frontier: Elite II (1993) and Frontier: First Encounters (1995), computer games written by David Braben et al. Hundreds of light-years away from populated space, the Antares system will remain unpopulated for the foreseeable future since it has no planets. The binary companion Antares B is present in the game, but the characteristics of its orbit (a period of 140.8 years and a radius of 75.2 AU) are far below actual estimates.
 The Scorpius Equation (1993), novel written by Larry Townsend. Human beings are captured and forced into slavery by aliens from the Scorpius Empire, centered on the star Antares (the alpha star of the constellation Scorpio).
 Master of Orion II: Battle at Antares (1996), computer-based strategy game designed by Steve Barcia and Ken Burd. A conflict occurs between the Orions and the Antarans, who come from a planet called Antares.
 Descent: FreeSpace – The Great War (1998), computer game developed by Volition and published by Interplay Entertainment. Antares is the primary star of a planetary system that may be visited in the universe of this game.
 Antares (2007–2011), series of graphic novels by Luiz Eduardo de Oliveira (Léo). The series, comprising four volumes, is set on the planet Antares. After the failure of the Betelgeuse colonisation mission, series heroine Kim is back on Earth. Meanwhile, advance scouts in the Antares system have witnessed some distressingly strange events. Worried about the future of this new mission, the sponsors of the Antares project call upon Kim to accompany the first colonists, offering legal amnesty for Alexa and Mark in exchange.
Analogue: A Hate Story (2012), visual novel/interactive game by Christine Love, set in the far future (compare her near-future prequel Digital: A Love Story). The player character has the task of investigating the logs of the lost generation colony ship Mugunghwa, which has been found drifting lifelessly around Antares' secondary companion star, Antares B. In doing so, the player communicates with and is helped by two artificial intelligences, *Hyun-ae and *Mute.
 Star Control II (1992), computer game developed by Toys for Bob and published by Accolade. Alpha Scorpii I is a "Shattered World", a planet terraformed by the Mycon using their organic "Deep Child" devices. It is one of three planets where Deep Child Eggcase Fragments, an item necessary to advance the plot, can be found.
 Uchu Sentai Kyuranger (2017), tokusatsu TV series. It is shown that the Sasori Tribe of the Scorpius System has a forbidden technique called "Antares", which increases combat skills, but kills its user in the process.
 Saint Seiya. Antares is the fifteenth and the last attack, called as the Scarlett Neddle, which is the most powerful attack of the Scorpius Gold Saint.
 Ghost Quartet (2015) Antares is the first star Rose Red sees in the Astronomer's telescope.
Ward (2017–2020), sequel to the web serial Worm, written by Wildbow.  Antares is the name taken by the superhero protagonist, Victoria Dallon.
Stellaris Invicta Season 2 (2020-), a dramatized version of the video game Stellaris that can be found on YouTube. Though not the actual Antares system, the Antares Confederacy, the empire that the story focuses on, is named after it.
 In the animated strip "Time" from xkcd, set in approximately AD 13000, Antares is not visible in the night sky, as it has gone supernova in the interim.

Arcturus (Alpha Boötis)
 A Voyage to Arcturus (1920), novel by David Lindsay. The story narrates a mystical inner passage through a sequence of fantastic landscapes, set on Tormance, an imaginary planet orbiting Arcturus—which in the novel (but not in reality) is a double star system, consisting of the stars Branchspell and Alppain. Ethical precepts and trials of the soul are embodied in the extraordinary Tormance lifeforms. Voyage is thought to have inspired C. S. Lewis' Cosmic Trilogy novels.
 Death from a Distance (1935). Arcturus is prominent in the setting.
 Tékumel (1940s onwards), novels and games by M. A. R. Barker. Arcturus is the home sun of the Páchi Léi, or Forest Dwellers.
 What Mad Universe (1949), novel written by Fredric Brown. In a parallel universe, human beings are engaged in total war with the Arcturians, who seek to conquer the Solar System and exterminate all beings other than themselves. Humans often refer to these creatures by the sharply derogatory epithet "Arcs".
Foundation series (1951–1993), novels by Isaac Asimov. Arcturus (the planet) is a capital of the Sirius Sector in the Galactic Empire.
 Alien From Arcturus (1956), expanded as Arcturus Landing (1978), novel by Gordon R. Dickson describing an attempt to build a ship with a faster-than-light propulsion system. The aliens in this novel, sublimated sex-objects, are decidedly cuddly, with shiny black noses, and a striking resemblance to the Ewoks of the Star Wars franchise.
 "The Curse of Peladon" (1972), serial written by Brian Hayles for the television series Doctor Who. Mars and Arcturus are depicted as old enemies. The Arcturan in the show is quite grotesque – a tentacled head in a glass dome mounted on a mechanized life support box that allows it to breathe in Peladon's atmosphere.
 "The Teddysaurus" (1973), short story by James Hamilton-Paterson describes Arcturus V as an Earth-like planet with half of Earth's gravity and a pinkish sky. Sixty foot tall trees with long, translucent skin-coloured leaves dominate the landscape. The largest life form is the 'teddysaurus', a forty-foot high creature resembling teddy bears but with six legs, long fangs and golden fur. They are hunted nearly to extinction by bored rich humans in the 27th century.
 The New Adventures of Wonder Woman (December 1977), in the episodes "Mind Stealers from Outer Space" parts 1 & 2; Arcturus is the homeworld of Andros.
 Superman: Last Son of Krypton (December 1978), a novel by Elliot S. Maggin, identifies Arcturus as the star around which the doomed world Krypton orbited before that planet exploded. Maggin also used the identification in two additional books, Miracle Monday (1981) and Kingdom Come (1998).
 Buck Rogers in the 25th Century (1979–1981), television series developed by Glen A. Larson. Arcturus is the home system of a race of telepaths.
 The Hitchhiker's Guide to the Galaxy (1978–1992), novels and other media by Douglas Adams. Arcturus is the home of the enormous transport Arcturan Megafreighters, and also home to a staggering array of oversized and often deadly megafauna, from the Arcturan Megaleech to the Arcturan Megacamel, well known by the turn of phrase "one's soul moves at the speed of an Arcturan Megacamel". The supercomputer Deep Thought boasts that "The Great Hyperlobic Omni-Cognate Neutron Wrangler could talk all four legs off an Arcturan Megadonkey, but only I could persuade it to go for a walk afterwards."
 The Black Hole (1979). Arcturus 10 is the name of a spacecraft manufactured by and for the UK space program in the year 2130 AD. 
 Spacecraft 2000–2100 AD (1978), a Terran Trade Authority book by Stewart Cowley. In 2029, a series of Pathfinder FTL probes were sent to Alpha Centauri, Vega and Arcturus. The Pathfinder Arcturus probe found two habitable planets, one of which is very similar to Earth, and in 2078 the colony ship Voyager was sent to colonize the Earth-like world. In 2090, another colony ship, Voyager II, was sent to Arcturus, accompanied by a Connestoga-class super-freighter. In 2102, Voyager III embarked on its journey to Arcturus, along with two Connestogas, one of which became a recharging facility halfway between Arcturus and Sol. Before the recharging station was established, a one-way trip from Sol to Arcturus took eight years.
 Return from the Stars (1980), English translation of the 1961 Polish language novel by Stanislaw Lem. The novel tells the story of the astronaut Hal Bregg, who returns to Earth after a 127-year mission to Arcturus (Fomalhaut in the Polish original).
 The Book of Dreams (1981), novel by Jack Vance. Arcturus is the home sun of the planet Arcturus IV, where master criminal Howard Alan Treesong is accosted in a back street of Bugtown by a petty thief. The mugger, it turns out, is not registered with the Organization. He receives a tongue lashing, but not one cent from Howard, who turns him in for a fink.
 Aliens (1986), film written and directed by James Cameron. Arcturus is a planet visited on furlough by the unit of Colonial Marines now accompanying protagonist Ellen Ripley (Sigourney Weaver).
 2300 AD (1986), role-playing game designed by the Game Designers' Workshop. The Arcturus system is the location of Station Arcture, a human research station invaded by the alien race of Kafers. In the game module "Mission Arcturus", players are required to retake the station from the Kafers.
 Spaced Invaders (1990), satirical film written by Patrick Read Johnson and Scott Lawrence Alexander, and directed by Patrick Read Johnson. The Martians are fighting a war with the "Arcturians", from the Arcturus system (compare Arcturus: "The Curse of Peladon" above).
 Star Control II (1992), computer game developed by Toys for Bob and published by Accolade. The Arcturus system contains the homeworld of a now-extinct race called the Burvixese. In this game, Alpha Boötis is represented (contrafactually) as a separate system in another part of the galaxy as well as an orange dwarf instead of the orange giant actually is.
 Frontier: Elite II (1993) and Frontier: First Encounters (1995), computer games written by David Braben et al. The Arcturus system's sole habitable planet Discovery is a member of the Federation that was colonized in 2304. Arcturus is infamous for being the home system of the deadly (and exceedingly popular) narcotic known as Arcturan Megaweed (compare Arcturus: The Hitchhiker's Guide to the Galaxy above).
 A Million Open Doors (1993), first in the series of four Thousand Cultures novels by John Barnes. In this novel Wilson, the home planet of protagonist Giraut Leones, orbits Arcturus. In the series, Wilson is home to a single culture, Nou Occitan, based on Occitan literature. The four novels in the series examine the effects of globalization on isolated societies.
 Escape Velocity Nova (2002), computer game developed and published by Ambrosia Software. The Arcturus system is a remote but well-travelled Federation system whose main income derives from mining on the planet Fermia.
 Mass Effect (2007), videogame developed by BioWare and published by Microsoft Game Studios. According to the game story information, the Solar System's only mass relay, once the core of the moon Charon of the dwarf planet Pluto, is linked to a relay orbiting Arcturus, which is a hub of several other relays. Arcturus Station, the capital of the human Systems Alliance, was founded and built in this advantageous location.
 Ninjago: Masters of Spinjitzu (2011–present), Arcturus is the name of an Anacondrai General Arcturus who was banished to the Cursed Realm by the Elemental Masters. The people of Ninjago named one of the zodiac after the general.
 In the film Passengers (2016), there is a sequence where the two main characters (Jim and Aurora) see Arcturus during their journey, as part of a gravity sling around the star, as the starship Avalon is traveling at half the speed of light.
 Harry Potter (1997–2007), fantasy novels written by J. K. Rowling. Arcturus Black III was the paternal grandfather of Sirius Black. Members of the Black family were commonly named after stars.
 The Simpsons, in the episode You Only Move Twice Homer takes a job at Globex Corporation working on a project revealed to be called "Project Arcturus"

Atlas (27 Tauri)
 The 2018 video game Starlink: Battle for Atlas is set in a fictional solar system around Atlas.

Barnard's Star

Barnard's Star is a red dwarf of apparent magnitude 9 and is thus too dim to be seen with the unaided eye. However, at approximately 6 light-years away it is the second-closest stellar system to the Sun; only the Alpha Centauri system is known to be closer. Intense stellar flares were observed in 1998 and 2019, so in reality habitation may be difficult.

 The Legion of Space (1934), magazine series and later (1947) a fix-up written by Jack Williamson. Barnard's Star is host to a gigantic planet that is populated by ferocious animals, and that is home to the single city of the ancient and dreadful race of the Medusae.
 The Black Corridor (1969), novel by Michael Moorcock. The planet Munich 15040 orbiting Barnard's Star is the destination for a band of refugees fleeing social breakdown on the Earth.
 Blindpassasjer (1978), Norwegian television series by Jon Bing and Tor Åge Bringsværd. Barnard's Star is orbited by Rossum, a planet inhabited by robots that, inexplicably, have the semblance of pre-industrial European agricultural laborers.
 Spacecraft 2000–2100 AD (1978), a Terran Trade Authority book by Stewart Cowley. A planet in the Barnard's Star system is haunted by a peculiar apparition that takes the form of a mysterious spacecraft.
 The Hitchhiker's Guide to the Galaxy (1978–1993), novels and other media by Douglas Adams. Barnard's Star is a way station for interstellar travelers.
 The Alien Encounters (1979), film written and directed by James T. Flocker. It is an American B movie which follows the story of an investigator who is sent to locate an alien probe which has landed on Earth. Aliens from Barnard's Star have created a machine known as a betaron which has remarkable rejuvenating effects.
 Galactica Discovers Earth (1980), triple episode and novelization by Michael Resnick from the television series Galactica 1980. Dr. Zee conjectures that the Cylons are located at Barnard's Star, awaiting the Galacticans' arrival at the Earth, before making their final strike.
 Downbelow Station (1981) and other Alliance-Union universe works, novels by C. J. Cherryh. Barnard's Star is the site of Alpha Station, the first station out from the Earth on the "Great Circle" chain of space stations that terminates at Pell Station in the Tau Ceti system.
 Rocheworld (1985), novel by Robert L. Forward. Barnard's star is orbited by the double planet Rocheworld, comprising Roche (rock) and Eau (water). The first human settlers travel to Barnard's Star using a laser-pumped light sail, on a journey lasting 40 years.
 Hyperion (1989–1997), novels by Dan Simmons. Barnard's Star is the sun of the agricultural planet Barnard's World, where it hangs above the leafy streets "like a great, tethered, red balloon". It is the homeworld of Rachel and Sol Weintraub.
 The Garden of Rama (1991), novel by Arthur C. Clarke and Gentry Lee. There is a way station at Barnard's Star for the arrival and departure of massive cylindrical world ships.
 Timemaster (1992), novel by Robert L. Forward. A billionaire makes a six-year journey to the Barnard's Star system to open a wormhole in 2049.
 Marooned on Eden (1993), novel by Robert L. Forward with Margaret Dodson Forward. The starship Prometheus takes a crew on a 40-year mission to Zuni, an inhabitable moon orbiting the planet Gargantua of Barnard's Star.
 Frontier: Elite II (1993) and Frontier: First Encounters (1995), computer games written by David Braben et al. Barnard's Star is an important Federation industrial system, close to Earth and the other Core Systems, and possessing thriving mining and refining industries. In the games, it is a good place for beginners to start their trading activities—there are no pirates in the system, and profits are lucrative. The star has the same fictional planetary system in Elite Dangerous, where it has an extraction economy.
 Terminal Velocity (1995), video game developed by Terminal Reality and published by 3D Realms. The game has three episodes, the first of which is distributed as shareware. Each episode features three different worlds, making a total of nine levels. In the first level of the first episode, game play takes place on Ymir, a planet orbiting Barnard's Star.
 The Flowers That Bloom in the Spring (1996), a novella that appeared in Analog Science Fiction and Fact (June 1997) by Wolf Read. A double planet orbiting within the habitable zone of Barnard's star has unusually fast seasons due to a short year relative to the Earth. A world with a high amount of land area, the troposphere is impoverished in water vapor save for coastal regions. In essence, the moderating effect of the oceans is reduced compared to the Earth, a contributing factor to the rapid seasonal response.
 GURPS Traveller (1998), role-playing game designed by the Game Designers' Workshop. Barnard's Star is the first interstellar destination for jump ships from the Earth. The Barnard's Star system supports a colony of humans from the Vilani Imperium.
 DarkSpace (2001), MMORPG developed by Palestar and published by Got Game Entertainment. Barnard's Star and its planetary system are a gaming location in DarkSpace.
 Life on Another Planet (2007), graphic novel written and drawn by Will Eisner. The storyline concerns the reaction of humans on Earth after a signal is detected from intelligent beings on a planet orbiting Barnard's Star.
 Saucerers and Gondoliers, a children's science fiction novel by Dominic Green, in which Barnard's Star is orbited by the ill-fated American colony of New Dixie.
 Evacuate Earth (2012), a documentary by the National Geographic Channel, in which Barnard's Star is discovered to harbor the habitable planet Barnard C352, most commonly referred to as Earth 2.0, the selected location for humanity as a rogue neutron star destroys the Earth.
 The Prox Transmissions (2015), novel wrote by Dustin Bates of Starset, telling the backstory of the fictitious Starset Society. It centers around a scientist at SETI receiving a transmission from the year 2047 and trying to decrypt it while avoiding the powerful and dangerous USCOO organization.
Stellaris (2016), real-time grand strategy game set in space designed by Paradox Interactive. Barnard's Star and its planets are one of the in-game star systems which players can colonize.
Barnard's Star (2018), single comic strip about Barnard's star.
Frenner 2 (1985), one of the first extrasolar colonies in FTL:2448 RPG.

Beta Aquarii (Sadalsuud)
 Rhialto the Marvellous (1984), "Dying Earth" novel by Jack Vance. Beta Aquarii controls a planet of the same name, Sadal Suud (two words). In this novel, set in the last days of the Earth, the witches battle the wizards (including Rhialto himself). Llorio the Murthe is a witch; her home is on Sadal Suud. But the planet is "a steaming quagmire infested by owls, gnats and rodents: quite unsuitable for one of [her] delicacy".
 Star Control II (1992), computer game developed by Toys for Bob and published by Accolade. Beta Aquarii I, known as Fahz, is the homeworld of the Utwig, who claim to have arisen from a location on the planet known as the Murky Bog.
 Starman Jones (1953), one of the Heinlein juveniles by Robert A. Heinlein. Beta Aquarii X, named Nova Terra, is an Earth colony, described as better than Earth ever was.
 Baten Kaitos Origins (2006), video game produced by Monolith Soft. One of the Five Great Nations, although written as "Sadal Suud"

Beta Aquilae (Alshain)
 SpaceWreck: Ghost Ships and Derelicts of Space (1979), a Terran Trade Authority book by Stewart Cowley. The story "The Warworld of Alshain" is set on Alshain IV, a dying world inhabitaged by a race once technologically advanced, but now reduced to cannibalistic savagery who haunt the ruins of their once great civilization.
 "Eye of the Beholder" (1994), episode of Star Trek: The Next Generation written by René Echevarria (teleplay) and Brannon Braga (story). This episode establishes Beta Aquilae II as Federation territory in the 24th century, home to a human population and a Starfleet training installation.
 FreeSpace 2 (1999), combat simulation computer game designed by Dave Baranec et al., and published by Volition. In 2358 a constitution was signed at the Beta Aquilae system later to be known as the Beta Aquilae Convention (BETAC). BETAC consolidated power in the Galactic Terran Vasudan Alliance as the supreme authority in all of Terran-Vasudan space.
 American progressive thrash metal band Vektor prominently features Alshain in the mythos of its 2016 concept album Terminal Redux. The story's titular character, a frenzied astronaut, retrieves a life-giving molecule from the destroyed star Alshain which "revitalizes him and extends his life".

Beta Aurigae (Menkalinan)
 "Turnabout Intruder" (1969), episode of Star Trek: The Original Series written by Arthur H. Singer. The mission of the USS Enterprise to rendezvous with the USS Potemkin at Beta Aurigae is undermined by a body-switching struggle between Captain Kirk and his onetime intimate, Dr. Janice Lester.
 Great Space Battles (1979) and SpaceWreck: Ghostships and Derelicts of Space (1979), Terran Trade Authority books by Stewart Cowley. Menkalinan has a resource-rich asteroid belt that hosts Gentlemen's Dig, a large and highly profitable asteroid mining operation.
 Wheelworld (1981), novel by Harry Harrison. Beta Aurigae has a system of six planets; the third planet Halvmörk is the only habitable one. The novel's protagonist must lead colonists on a hazardous journey after re-supply ships from Earth fail to appear on schedule. Contrary to fact, Beta Aurigae is a white dwarf in this novel.

Beta Caeli
 Alien Legacy (1994), video strategy game developed by Joe Ybarra and published by Sierra Entertainment. The game includes elements of city construction, research, resource management, industrial production and combat, all starting with the arrival of the colony ship UNS Calypso together with its player/captain at the planet Gaea in the Beta Caeli star system. Another ship, the UNS Tantalus, was dispatched to Beta Caeli after Calypso, but because of intervening advances in technology it arrived first.

Beta Canum Venaticorum (Chara)
 Great Space Battles (1979), a Terran Trade Authority book by Stewart Cowley and Charles Herridge. The short story "The Hunters of Asterion" describes Asterion (another name for Beta Canum Venaticorum) having two planets; Asterion II is a human farming world that developed an unusual culture of farmers, protected by "Hunters", a formidable warrior caste. Asterion II has several dangerous predatory animal species, such as the Great White-Maned Tooteez and the Wooswoos, which were ritually hunted for sport by the Hunters. 
 2300 AD (1986), role-playing game designed by the Game Designers' Workshop. Beta Canum is a garden planet orbiting Beta Canum Venaticorum, and it houses three colonies (British, German and French), as well as the alien enclave of the Pentapods.
 The Chara Talisman (2011), a T-Space (terraformed space) book by Alastair Mayer, an expansion of his Analog short story "Stone Age". A seemingly primitive talisman turns out to have a high-tech interior, and the star pattern engraved on its surface points to Chara (Beta Canum Venaticorum).  An expedition to the long-ago terraformed world Chara III turns up an alien pyramid, evidence that archaeologist Hannibal Carson has been looking for to back his theory of ancient spacefarers.

Beta Corvi (Kraz)
 Starman Jones (1953), novel written by Robert A. Heinlein. Beta Corvi III is a planet with humanoid inhabitants.
The Ship Who Sang (1969), fixup of short stories by Anne McCaffrey.  In the fourth tale, "Dramatic Mission", the main character, Helva, travels to the gas giant Beta Corvi IV, meeting the "Beta Corviki", a sentient race who live on the planet.
 Star Control II (1992), computer game developed by Toys for Bob and published by Accolade. The gas giant Beta Corvi IV, or Source, is home to a sentient species of incandescent gas bags called the Slylandro. Star Control II used names of real constellations and stars for fictional stars: In the game, Beta Corvi is a green dwarf instead of a bright yellow giant. The game's optional side quest to this planet is an homage to Anne McCaffrey's short story (q.v.).

Beta Crucis (Mimosa)
The 1968 science fiction novel  Satan's World, by Poul Anderson, deals with the consequences of a rogue planet encountering Beta Crucis.
The 2002 science fiction novel  Schild's Ladder, by Greg Egan in its prologue depicts the huge scientific lab located in outer space in 6 light months from Mimosa.

Beta Draconis (Rastaban)
 SpaceWreck: Ghostships and Derelicts of Space (1979), a Terran Trade Authority book by Stewart Cowley. Alwaid, another name for Beta Draconis, was the destination of the generation ship Jancis Jo, which set out for Alwaid in the early 22nd century.

Beta Eridani (Cursa)
 The Waters of Andros (2007), novel by Madsen Pirie. Pirie writes, "Andros is a beautiful and perfectly formed blue jewel of a planet, sparkling in the blackness of space. It is far away, circling the distant [89 ly] star Beta Eridani."
 The Art of the Impossible, 2003 Star Trek: The Lost Era novel by Keith R. A. DeCandido. Cursa is the primary of a planetary system controlled by the Klingon Empire, and is attacked by the Cardassian Union in the year 2333.
 Star Trek Online (2010), video game by Cryptic Studios. Cursa is the site of the mission "Test of Mettle", in which the newly promoted Klingon Defense Force player character takes their newest ship on a shakedown cruise and is attacked by warriors from the recently dissolved House of Torg.

Beta Fornacis
 SpaceWreck: Ghostships and Derelicts of Space (1979), a Terran Trade Authority book by Stewart Cowley. In the short story "Children of the Gods", set in the mid-25th century, a smuggling ship lands on the Earth-like world of Beta Fornacis III while on the run from Terran Federation authorities, and discovers a friendly alien race inhabiting that planet.

Beta Hydri
 Uller Uprising, (1952), a novel by H. Beam Piper. Uller, a colonized planet with silicon-based life forms, is in the Beta Hydri system.
 Time for the Stars (1956), a novel by Robert Heinlein. This novel explores the twin paradox as one of a pair of twins linked by instantaneous telepathy sets out on a space voyage on the interstellar torchship Lewis and Clark. Among the stars visited is Beta Hydri.
 A Canticle for Leibowitz (1959), a novel by Walter M. Miller Jr. In the last part of the novel, Fiat Voluntas Tua, Beta Hydri is briefly mentioned as one of the few existing extrasolar colonies of humanity in the year 3781.
 "Daughters of Earth" (1968), a short story by Judith Merril. In 2091, the star's second planet Uller is colonized by the 500 crew members of the starship Newhope after a 43-year voyage (compare Beta Hydri: Uller Uprising above).
 The Man in the Maze (1969), a novel by Robert Silverberg. A science-fiction rework of Sophocles' "Philoctetes" set in a future where humans are actively exploring distant space – Muller, the central character living alone in self-imposed exile in a lethal maze constructed by long-extinct aliens, has been altered by current uncommunicative aliens living on Beta Hydri IV to broadcast intolerably depressive emotion telepathically, but because of this unique characteristic must be persuaded to assist humanity to communicate their consciousness to another expanding telepathic species with the capability to take over and control large human communities.
 Great Space Battles (1979), a Terran Trade Authority book by Stewart Cowley and Charles Herridge. The book's first half, "Part One—The Laguna Wars", is the story of a war in 2219–2220 between the Terrans and the inhabitants of Laguna IX, which is identified as Beta Hydri in one illustration. The book also mentions Laguna VII, the only source of the medicine which prevents a devastating disease.
 SpaceWreck: Ghostships and Derelicts of Space (1979), a Terran Trade Authority book by Stewart Cowley. Silvermine in the Beta Hydri system is the origin of the derelict freighter which is the focus of the plot. 
 Beta Hydri is one of the six star systems in the Star Trader board game (1982) set in SPI's Universe role-playing game. The others are Epsilon Eridani, Gamma Leporis, Mu Herculis, Sigma Draconis, and Tau Ceti.
 Frontier: Elite II (1993), Frontier: First Encounters (1995) and Elite: Dangerous (2014), computer games written by David Braben et al. Beta Hydri is controlled by the Federation. The player needs a permit to enter the system. It has two earthlike planets with a population of several billions.
 Calculating God (2000), a novel written by Robert J. Sawyer. The character Hollus, an alien whose species calls themselves the Forhilnor, is from the fictional third planet in the Beta Hydri system, Beta Hydri III.
Earth and Beyond (2002), an MMORPG that was the last game developed by Westwood Studios.  The game featured several star systems that could be visited by players, including Beta Hydri.  The Beta Hydri system as depicted featured seven planets, six of which were named for Mercury program astronauts.  Astronaut Wally Schirra was omitted from the list, but a moon in one of the planetary systems was named for him.
 Stellvia (2003), an anime television series written by Ichirō Ōkouchi et al. The Earth of the year 2167 AD is devastated by a powerful electromagnetic pulse caused when a nearby star, "Hydrus Beta", goes supernova. This fictional star is loosely based on Beta Hydri; it is 20 light-years away from the Earth, compared to 24.4 light-years for the real star.
 Old Twentieth (2005), a novel by Joe Haldeman. The novel is set in a generation ship which is destined for Beta Hydri.
 Seed (2006), MMORPG developed by Runestone Game Development. The first of five interstellar seed ships that will terraform and then colonize extrasolar planets is dispatched to a planet of Beta Hydri that has an atmosphere, water and living microorganisms.
 The Marann (2013), a PRISM award-winning novel by Christie Meierz, and first of a series. The novel is set on the fictional fourth planet in the Beta Hydri system, called Tolar by its inhabitants. A somewhat "King and I" story, in which a schoolteacher is sent from Earth to tutor the daughter of the planet's ruler.

Beta Leporis (Nihal)
 Starliners: Commercial Travel in 2200 AD (1980), a Terran Trade Authority book by Stewart Cowley. Nihal hosts a system of seven planets, three of which are inhabited. Nihalan is the homeworld of the Nihalans, an advanced alien race who allowed the Terran Federation to mine the planet for its extensive mineral deposits, in exchange for humanity assisting the Nihalans with bringing tourists and income to their world, which is renowned for its religious monuments of profound size. Nihalan Imphit passenger line was founded in 2219.

Beta Librae (Zubeneschamali)
 The Golden Helix (1979), collection of short stories by Theodore Sturgeon. The title story "The Golden Helix" is set on a planet circling Beta Librae.
 Star Control II (1992), computer game developed by Toys for Bob and published by Accolade. The Supox Utricularia come from Beta Librae I. They call the star "Root" and the planet "Vlik", which means "Perfectly Good and Nutritious Dirt" (although their ships' translation system translated it as "Earth", initially causing some confusion).

Beta Pavonis
 SpaceWreck: Ghostships and Derelicts of Space (1979), a Terran Trade Authority book by Stewart Cowley. A massive space "graveyard" of derelict spacefaring vessels (including ships of Earth and Proximan origin) was discovered in orbit of a planet in the Beta Pavonis system, which was the source of jury-rigged spaceships illegally sold to the Terran miners of Alpha Indi II, by a group of scavengers called "Jackers".

Beta Phoenicis
 Starliners: Commercial Travel in 2200 AD (1980), a Terran Trade Authority book by Stewart Cowley. By the mid-23rd century, the Beta Phoenicis system was the most complex solar system yet discovered, with 27 planets, three large asteroid belts, and one habitable moon, Esthymon; in order to bring in the millions of galactic tourists wanting to visit Esthymon's thousands of ultra-luxurious hotels and resorts, Esthymon National Spacelines was founded in 2231. Esthymon is also the homeworld of Wildway Tours, which specializes in tourism and adventure holidays on unexplored worlds, and Challenge Express, a high-speed transport service.

Beta Pyxidis
 Starliners: Commercial Travel in 2200 AD (1980), a Terran Trade Authority book by Stewart Cowley. A planet in the Beta Pyxidis system is the homeworld of GMA Transport (founded in 2194) and Aquatours, subsidiary companies of the Galactic Mining Association. The companies are known for low-cost, basic passenger services and underwater mining tours, respectively. In 2251, Archaeo Tours was created to comfortably transport tourists to worlds where scientific research is underway. Archaeo Tours is also known for their excellent science education facilities aboard their passenger liners.

Beta Tauri (El Nath)
 "The Galileo Seven" (1967), episode of Star Trek: The Original Series written by Oliver Crawford and S. Bar-David. Mr. Spock and other crew members of the USS Enterprise are exploring the Murasaki 312 phenomenon in the #7 shuttlecraft. Soon after launch, the shuttle is pulled off course and out of the Enterprise's sensor range. Spock makes an emergency landing on the planet Taurus II, a rocky, fog-shrouded world that is the second planet of Beta Tauri.

Beta Ursae Majoris (Merak) 
In the original Star Trek: The Original Series episode "The Cloud Minders", the planet Merak II is said to be suffering from a botanical plague that can only be treated by the use of the mineral zenite.
The video game Devil Survivor 2 features Merak, alongside the other stars of the Big Dipper, as the Septentrione, strange beings that appear in Japan on each day of the game. Merak features on the 2nd day in Osaka, Japan.
In the anime Saint Seiya, also known as Knights of the Zodiac, the God Warriors are the main antagonists during the Asgard arc, each star of the Big Dipper serves as a guardian for each God Warrior. Hagen is the name of the God Warrior representing the star Beta Merak.

Beta Virginis (Zavijava) 
 Tau Zero (1970), novel by Poul Anderson.  The novel follows the crew of the starship Leonora Christine, a colonization vessel crewed by 25 men and 25 women aiming to reach Beta Virginis III, which an instrumented probe has pronounced habitable. Powered by a Bussard ramjet, the ship malfunctions and ends up going faster and faster, ever approaching the speed of light. Presently the crew must face the fact that, due to relativistic time contraction, they have long outlived the rest of humanity.
 In the Orion's Arm worldbuilding project, Beta Virginis is home to one of humanity's early interstellar colonies, the oceanic planet of Pacifica.

Betelgeuse (Alpha Orionis)
 The Cthulhu Mythos (1921- ), fictional universe created by H. P. Lovecraft et al. In August Derleth's interpretation of the Mythos, Betelgeuse is the home of the benign Elder Gods.
 Storm and Echo (1948), novel by Frederic Prokosch. Prokosch wrote "travel novels" that were a blend of travelogue, story, philosophy, symbolism, and fantasy. In Storm and Echo, a story about tropical travels, he wrote: "And that night for the first time I came face to face with it. The real unutterable thing: the thing I'd never dared to visualize. Death. My own death. The possibility, corrupt and glaring, of my own extinction. It was like swimming alone at night in a hot, shoreless sea. I felt abominably alone. Twelve men and a woman marching in a column through the Equator. No other trace of humanity. No trace of history even. It might for all we knew have been the wastes of Betelgeuse."
 "Shell Game" (1954), short story by Philip K. Dick. A group of paranoid mental patients long stranded on Betelgeuse II discover the remains of their shipwrecked hospital vessel "sunk in the half-liquid ooze that made up the surface of Betelgeuse II. Nocturnal phosphorescence danced and flitted over the bog."
 The Red Eye of Betelgeuse [Rotes Auge Beteigeuze] and The Earth Dies [Die Erde Stirbt] (1962), installments 48–49 [40–41 in the U.S. edition] of the Perry Rhodan series of space-opera pulp novelettes, both installments written by Walter Ernsting as by Clark Darlton. In these installments of the long-running English version of the [originally German] series, Perry Rhodan battles the Springers (a race of merchants descended from the Arkonides of the Great Imperium in globular cluster M13) who plan to colonize the Earth. Rhodan has to simulate the destruction of our world in order to divert the ever more intrusive Springers, and give humanity the time it needs to develop into a galactic power. Deceived by him, and believing it to be the Earth, the Springers attack Betelgeuse III and destroy it.
 Planet of the Apes (1963), novel by Pierre Boulle. Professor Antelle, a scientific genius of Earth, has invented a spaceship that can travel at nearly the speed of light. He and his companions voyage to the star Betelgeuse, said to be "about three hundred light years distant from our planet", and "emit[ting] red and orange lights"; at the end of their spacefaring they awaken from cryosleep to discover themselves near an earthlike planet that they name Soror (Sister). The crew lands, is overcome by a tribe of primitive humans, and then captured by intelligent gorillas and chimpanzees, who enslave them and treat them as dumb beasts. At the novel's climax, they make a startling discovery about the history of Soror. They escape and return to the Earth, where they make an even more startling discovery.

Canopus (Alpha Carinae)

 Interstellar Patrol (1929-1930), series by Edmond Hamilton. Canopus is the headquarters of the Interstellar patrol and seat of the great Council of Suns.
 The Star Kings (1947), novel by Edmond Hamilton. Canopus is a capital of the Middle Galactic Empire.
 Star Bridge (1955), novel by James Gunn and Jack Williamson. The scattered planets are held together by the Eron Company, holder—at least apparently—of the secret of faster-than-light travel through the Tubes. The Tubes are powered by drawing energy from the star Canopus.
 The Stars My Destination (1956), classic science fiction novel (titled Tiger! Tiger! in the UK) written by Alfred Bester. After his apotheosis in the burning cathedral, the legendary Gully Foyle teleports stark naked to the vicinity of several stars, including Canopus.
 Dune (1965) and other novels in the Dune universe by Frank Herbert. The third planet from Canopus is the desert planet Arrakis (Dune), the only source melange, the most important and valuable substance in the Dune universe.
 "Where No Man Has Gone Before" (1966), episode of Star Trek: The Original Series written by Samuel A. Peeples. The fictional sonnet Nightingale Woman is ascribed as written by "Tarbolde of Canopus" in the year 1996.
 "The Kidnappers" (1967), episode 28 of the television series The Time Tunnel created by Irwin Allen. The time travelers are transported to a planet orbiting Canopus to rescue Dr. Ann MacGregor, whose abductor left behind a metallic computer card providing the coordinates. In the episode, the distance from the Earth to Canopus is given as 98 light-years, a value within the broad range of distances considered possible by astronomers in 1967. With data provided by the Hipparcos satellite telescope (1989–1993) this distance is now known to be 310 light-years.
 "The Ultimate Computer" (1968), episode of Star Trek: The Original Series written by D. C. Fontana. The USS Enterprise visits the planet Alpha Carinae II. In the remastered version of the series (2008), the planet was refurbished and given a more realistic appearance.
 "The Eye of the Beholder" (1974), episode 15 of Star Trek: The Animated Series written by David P. Harmon. The Enterprise crew beams down to the planet Lactra VII to discover a series of unusual environments, including one constructed as a copy of the desert planet Canopus III (compare Canopus: Dune above). While exploring, the crew meets the Lactrans, a group of twenty foot slugs with intellectual capacities far beyond their own. The team is captured by the Lactrans to be made part of a zoo collection.
 Shikasta (1979), first novel in the Canopus in Argos series by literature Nobelist Doris Lessing. The series fictionally reinterprets the past history of the planet Shikasta (Earth) as playing out under the influence of three galactic empires: Canopus, Sirius, and their mutual enemy, Puttiora. The novel Shikasta is presented in the form of a series of reports by Canopean emissaries to Shikasta—but at a deeper level, it is a record of their struggle to come to terms with human sexuality, politics, and mortality, all through the lens of Sufi mysticism.
 BattleTech (1984–present), wargame and related products launched by The FASA Corporation. The Magistracy of Canopus is an interstellar nation in the fictional setting of BattleTech. The Magistracy was formed by defectors and soldiers from forces attached to the defense forces of Andurien.
 Frontier: Elite II (1993) and Frontier: First Encounters (1995), computer games written by David Braben et al. Canopus has colonies dedicated to mining, including two dwarf planets that share the name Camp Lawrence.
 Shin Megami Tensei: Devil Survivor 2 Record Breaker (2015), the remake of the SRPG Devil Survivor 2 by Atlus. It features Canopus as the final boss for the triangulum arc.

Capella (Alpha Aurigae)
 The Exiles of Capella (1949), Spiritist Portuguese language novel (Os Exilados da Capela) by the Brazilian author Edgard Armond. In this book, some of the natives of a Capellan planet are reborn in a pre-historical age on Earth due to their own misfortune and moral fall, and they help primitive humans' evolution, with ideas from Theosophy and pre-Adamite, the book these fallen spirits are also responsible for the rise of early real or mythical human civilizations, such as those of Egypt, China, India and even Atlantis.
 Lone Star Planet (1958), novel by H. Beam Piper. The planet of New Texas is Capella IV. The tongue-in-cheek tale, based on a satirical 1924 essay by H. L. Mencken, features a planet of Texans whose dinosaur-sized cattle have to be herded with tanks, and where assault or murder upon government employees is considered altogether justifiable.
 Starship Troopers (1959), novel by Robert A. Heinlein. The troop transport Tours is one big ship. She has the speed and the lift to deliver a double load of starship troopers to just about anywhere in fighting trim: "Under Cherenkov drive she cranks Mike 400 or better—say Sol to Capella, forty-six light-years, in under six weeks." From the numbers given by Heinlein  Mike 1 is intended to be equal to the speed of light in the vacuum of space—just as Mach 1 equals the speed of sound in the atmosphere of the Earth (at STP).
 "Friday's Child", a 1967 episode of Star Trek: The Original Series written by D. C. Fontana, is set on the fictional planet Capella IV. Dr. McCoy reports having lived on the planet and being familiar with its culture.
 Marvel comic books (1968), created by Stan Lee and John Buscema. The Sisterhood moiety of the alien Badoon are natives of Lotiara, or Capella II.
 Emphyrio (1969), novel by Jack Vance. Capella is the home star of the planet Maastricht (Capella V), where protagonist Ghyl Tarvoke is marooned in a remote region by space pirates. Making his way to the glittering white city Daille, he learns that his late father's carved screen REMEMBER ME is treasured as a priceless artifact in the Museum of Glory. The sky of Maastricht is a rich, soft blue with the sun, Capella, surrounded by a zone of pale glimmer. Vance draws Maastricht, its landscape, and its people with an exotic palette and flashing actinic brightness: he is an influential creator of imaginary worlds. "The first full-fleged modern planetary romance is therefore probably Jack Vance's ... [he] supplied sf writers with a model to exploit." Vancian worlds provide a rich environment together with off-world protagonists (In the case of Maastricht: Ghyl Tarvoke) whose need to travel across the planet provides a quest plot and a rationale for the lessons in anthropology and sociology so common to the form. Emphyrio is one of three novels showing Jack Vance's planet-building talents at their fullest stretch.
 The Listeners (1972), novel by James Gunn.  The plot involves a SETI-like program on Earth in communication with an alien civilization in the Capella system.
 Time's Last Gift (1972), Tarzan novel by Philip José Farmer. The revised edition adds an epilogue in which an immortal Tarzan leaves a tamed and civilized Earth for the wild worlds that orbit Capella.
 Capella's Golden Eyes (1980), first novel by Welsh author Christopher Evans. Human colonists deal with mysterious indigenous aliens.
 Great Space Battles (1979), a Terran Trade Authority book by Stewart Cowley and Charles Herridge. In the short story "The Pirate World", the Terran Federation deported a large group of mutants to a planet in the Capella system in the year 2128; these mutant settlers eventually became space pirates who hijacked commercial ore freighters in the Menkalinan system from 2256 to 2257, when FLEA & TDA troops tracked down the mutant pirates to their base in the Capella system and destroyed the main pirate operation.
 Starliners: Commercial Travel in 2200 AD (1980), a Terran Trade Authority book by Stewart Cowley. In 2212, a Terran Trade Authority vessel en route from Capella to Sol suffered a minor technical problem, and were forced to land on an unexplored semi-tropical planet (later named Commeck) in the Capella system, where they discovered a society of sentient, hospitable, subservient robots whose original alien masters had annihilated each other long ago. The robots were most willing to serve visitors to their world, and by 2229, Commeck Carriage was founded to bring tourists to visit Commeck.
 BattleTech (1984), wargame and related products launched by The FASA Corporation. Capella is the former governing system of the Capellan Confederation Successor State.
 The Rowan et seq. (1990), novels by Anne McCaffrey. This is the lead-off novel of the second series of "Talent" books, which feature an inhabited world in the Capella system. Major character Afra Lyon hails from there.
 Frontier: Elite II (1993) and Frontier: First Encounters (1995), computer games written by David Braben et al. Capella has many moon-based colonies and space stations orbiting the brown dwarf nearest to the primary star. Despite having several starports, this system has a population of less than 10,000 people.
 Escape Velocity (1996), computer game by Ambrosia Software. The Capella system is a fairly major trade hub in the Northeastern Confederation.
 FreeSpace 2 (1999), combat simulation computer game designed by Dave Baranec et al., and published by Volition. Capella is one of the core systems of the Galactic Terran Vasudan Alliance and is home to over 300 million Terrans. It is invaded by Shivan forces, and the star itself is destroyed.
 Halo: Evolutions (2009), a collection of short-stories and poems from Tor Books. It contains a story called The Impossible Life and the Possible Death of Preston J. Cole, written by Eric Nylund. A battle recounted in the story takes place in Alpha Aurigae, which saw Preston Cole defeat 12 Covenant warships.
 Journey to the Goat Star, a novella by Brian Aldiss, plays on the multiple meanings of capella – star, music, goat – whilst nominally being about a journey to the star.
  Capella, along with other stars in the Winter Triangle, Summer Triangle, and Winter Hexagon, comprise parts of the Tellarknight archetype in the Yu-Gi-Oh! Trading Card Game.  Together with another defining vertex of the Winter Triangle, Rigel, "Satellarknight Capella" is released in the Secrets of Eternity Booster Pack (2015), with Stellarknight Constellar Diamond representing the Winter Hexagon itself.
 Earth & Beyond (2002), Capella is a system largely occupied by the secretive humans of the Jenquai faction.

Caph (Beta Cassiopeiae)
 The Face (1979), "Demon Princes" novel by Jack Vance. At Serjeuz on Dar Sai, Kirth Gersen is entertaining Daswell Tippin, a receptionist at the Traveler's Inn who might be enlisted as his agent for certain business transactions. Gersen observes that Tippin is not a native of Dar Sai. Tippin replies, "Certainly not. I was born at Svengay, on Caph IV. A lively little world; have you ever visited there?" Gersen has not.

Chi Draconis
 Babylon 5 (1993–1998), television series developed and written by J. Michael Straczynski. Chi Draconis VII, or Minbar, is the home of the Minbari race. The Minbari characters of Delenn and Lennier figure prominently throughout the series.
 Full Thrust (1991–present), miniatures war game written by Jon Tuffley and published by Ground Zero Games. Chi Draconis is the location of a skirmish between ESU and Anglian forces.

Cygnus OB2-12
The Seer and the Silverman, a short story in the Xeelee Sequence by Stephen Baxter, is set in the Reef, a collection of abandoned spaceships near OB2#12.

CY Aquarii
 "Grendel" (1968), Known Space short story by Larry Niven published in the collection Neutron Star (1968). Sometime hero and space pilot Beowulf Schaeffer witnesses the kidnapping for ransom of the famous Kdatlyno touch-sculptor Lloobee. The crime takes place on the packet Argos out of Down, bound for Gummidgy, a planet of the SX Phoenicis-type variable star CY Aquarii. The star's strong ultraviolet light has driven the evolution of a teeming variety of life on the planet, from whose surface its pulsing sun looks like an "actinic pinpoint", and "a tiny bright point of agony". Schaeffer and his Jinxian companion pursue the kidnappers into the riotous jungles of Gummidgy, hoping to rescue the Kdatlyno.

Delta Boötis (Princeps)
 Starliners: Commercial Travel in 2200 AD (1980), a Terran Trade Authority book by Stewart Cowley. Delta Bootis possesses a system of eight planets; the outermost planet, Delta Bootis VIII, is New Mars, which was named after Mars in our own Solar System, due to the striking resemblance New Mars has compared to its namesake. Settled by Terran Federation colonists in 2163, the planet's mineral wealth was quickly exploited, but it was discovered that New Mars' equatorial region was ideal for growing a wide range of plants. As the planet's economy grew, Starlink spacelines was founded in 2201, which added a New Mars to Sol system run in 2245.

Delta Cephei
 SpaceWreck: Ghostships and Derelicts of Space (1979), a Terran Trade Authority book by Stewart Cowley. In 2506, the antiquated research ship Rollins II was conducting a data collection mission about one light-month away from Delta Cephei, when its obsolete sublight drive malfunctioned, causing ionized ice particles to envelop the ship. The Rollins IIs obsolete life-support system failed, and its crew died from hypothermia.

Delta Crateris
 Star Control II (1992), computer game developed by Toys for Bob and published by Accolade. The ancient Precursor Battle Platform known as the Sa-Matra is in orbit around Delta Crateris V. Destroying the Sa-Matra is the final objective in the game, and so Delta Crateris is the last location the player will visit.

Delta Draconis (Altais)
 Star Control II (1992), computer game developed by Toys for Bob and published by Accolade. Delta Draconis I is the homeworld of the Thraddash species.

Delta Eridani
 In Sky Captain and the World of Tomorrow , the star Rana, an alternate name for delta Eridani, is used to give directions.
 In Star Trek: The Next Generation, episode 3x03, "The Survivors," combined "Delta Eridani" and "Rana" as "Delta Rana," and surrounded a planetary attack on its fourth planet.
 In the Science Fiction novel "We are Legion (We are Bob)" by Dennis E. Taylor. The First, "first contact" occurs on Delta Eridani between "Bob 1" and a "Deltan" which "Bob 1" names "Archimedes" due to his clear mental prowess.

Delta1 Gruis
 SpaceWreck: Ghostships and Derelicts of Space (1979), a Terran Trade Authority book by Stewart Cowley. Delta1 Gruis has four planets, two of which are habitable by humans. One of the planets is covered by lush vegetation, and was named Eden. Unfortunately, Eden's fruits are saturated with amino acids that cause insanity & psychosis in humans, leading the members of two survey teams to kill each other off. Terran survey teams also found the long-derelict wrecks of three enormous alien spacecraft on Eden's surface; it was suspected that Eden's poisonous vegetation may have killed off the alien settlers as well. The other planet was discovered to be bombarded with unacceptably high levels of solar radiation, and subsequently both planets were placed under quarantine.

Delta Pavonis
 Dune (1965) and other novels in the Dune universe by Frank Herbert. Caladan, the third planet of Delta Pavonis, is the ancestral fiefdom of House Atreides, who have ruled it for twenty-six generations from the ancient Castle Caladan. An ocean planet, Caladan's surface is predominantly covered with water.
 The Right Hand of Dextra (1977) and The Wildings of Westron (1977), novels by David Lake. The novels are set on the planet Dextra of the Delta Pavonis system, where the first human settlers arrive after a subluminal flight from a post-holocaust Earth. Upon arrival they find that the genetic chemistry of their new home is enantiomorphic to their own, so that the abundant plants and animals can provide them no nourishment.
 "The Big Broadcast of 2006" (1984–1988), episode of the television series The Transformers directed by John Gibbs. Delta Pavonis IV is the home of a race of humanoid cats. A malfunctioning hypnotic Quintesson signal drives the cats to attack a neighbouring planet of humanoid dogs.
 "The Tree Lord of Imeten" (1966), by Tom Purdom.
 On My Way to Paradise (1989), novel by Dave Wolverton. Protagonist Angelo Osic, on the run from a frightening world of war and politics, enlists as a legionnaire with the multistellar Motoki corporation. Motoki has a military operation underway on the planet Baker of the Delta Pavonis system. The war grows complicated, with the legionnaires rebelling and seizing the Motoki city on Baker, then setting off across vast deserts to attack the rival Yabajin settlement.
 Delta Pavonis (1990), novel by John Maddox Roberts and Eric Kotani. The novel is set in the Delta Pavonis system.
 Frontier: Elite II (1993) and Frontier: First Encounters (1995), computer games written by David Braben et al.  The Delta Pavonis system is home to a Federation world, a planet that, while it is habitable, is no Garden of Eden: its surface is completely covered by a harsh desert.
 The Voices of Heaven (1994), novel by Frederik Pohl. The protagonist Barry Di Hoa is frozen and sent aboard a colony ship to the planet Pava in the Delta Pavonis star system.
 O Pioneer! (1998), novel by Frederik Pohl. The Delts, a sentient race, inhabit the planet Tupelo in orbit around Delta Pavonis in this novel.
 In the Orion's Arm worldbuilding project, this system is home to the life-bearing "Garden World" Darwin. The continents on this planet are named after the children of English naturalist Charles Darwin, who gave this planet its name.
"The Suspended Fourth" (2000), short story by Paul Levinson, published in Analog Science Fiction and Fact Magazine, March 2000.  Birds on the fictitious second planet of Delta Pavonis – Peacock – have been bred to sing certain kinds of songs to warn inhabitants of the planet of deadly dangers.
 Revelation Space universe (2000–), novels and stories by Alastair Reynolds. The planet Resurgam and the neutron star Hades are part of the Delta Pavonis system.
Calculating God (2000), novel written by Robert J. Sawyer. The alien race called the Wreeds are from a fictional planet in the Delta Pavonis system.
 Star Trek: Star Charts (2002), fictional reference book by Geoffrey Mandel. Delta Pavonis is orbited by the Federation planet Benzar, homeworld of the Benzites, a pisciform humanoid species. Benzites are highly resistant to poisons and other noxious substances. They can digest and derive nutrition from almost any organic compound.
 "Sundowner Sheila" (2006), novelette by F. Gwynplaine MacIntyre. Terra Nova is a planet orbiting Delta Pavonis in tidally locked rotation, so that one hemisphere of the planet is in perpetual darkness, and the other, Nevernight, is in perpetual daylight.
 The Serene Invasion (2013), novel by Eric Brown, has an alien race, calling themselves the S'rene (or Serene), which hail from Delta Pavonis V and benevolently appear on Earth in 2025 to end all war and end all need.
 "Star's Reach" (2014), by John Michael Greer. Delta Pavonis IV is the home of a post-industrial civilization of feathery bubbles contacting Earth.
 "For We Are Many" (2017), novel by Dennis E. Taylor. Delta Pavonis 4 is a planet home to an early-industrial civilization of "meerkat-like" beings.
 "Salvation" (2018), novel by Peter F. Hamilton. Akhita orbiting Delta Pavonis is a colonized exoplanet the main world of the Utopial community.

Delta Phoenicis
 SpaceWreck: Ghostships and Derelicts of Space (1979), a Terran Trade Authority book by Stewart Cowley. Delta Phoenicis has two planets. In the late 2340s, Terran Federation survey vessel D-3 landed on Salamander, a barely habitable world that experiences temperature extremes while orbiting Delta Phoenicis. While exploring the planet, the Terran crew discovered a human-built city entirely made out of ceramic, which was later named Salamander City. However, the original human settlers of Salamander City retreated underground to escape the planet's temperature extremes and their descendants devolved into sub-human creatures.
 Starliners: Commercial Travel in 2200 AD (1980), a Terran Trade Authority book by Stewart Cowley. The other planet in the same system is Antico, homeworld of Mercantile Services, one of the largest shipping companies in the Terran Federation. Eventually, the company expanded their services to transport passengers as well as cargo, which quickly turned very profitable. Founded in 2187, Mercantile Passenger Services, a subsidiary of their parent company, is noted for using Connestoga II colony supply ships, converted into luxury liners.

Delta Sagittarii (Kaus Media)
 Into the Sea of Stars (1969), novel written by William R. Forstchen. Colonial Unit 122, crewed entirely by women and sustained with a supply of sperm purged of the Y chromosome, begins a voyage to the Delta Sagittarii system in 2053 and is still en route a thousand years later.

Delta Trianguli
 In the Japanese anime and manga Trigun, the planet Gunsmoke, the main setting of the show, is located in this star system.

 

Deneb (Alpha Cygni)

 #15. Star of Dread (1943) and other books in the Captain Future series, number written by Edmond Hamilton. Captain Future is Curtis Newton, a brilliant scientist and adventurer who roams the Solar System solving problems, righting wrongs, and vanquishing supervillains. All of the planets of the system and many of the moons and asteroids are suitable for life, and most are inhabited by humanoids. Future and his sidekicks the Futuremen visit the planet Aar in the Deneb system (see graphic), which is the origin of Earth humans, as well as many manlike races across the Solar System and beyond.
 "The Feeling of Power" (1958), short story by Isaac Asimov. The Terrestrial Federation is at war with Deneb, and it depends on hand-held devices similar to the digital pocket calculators that would be unavailable until after 1971.  Asimov would later substantially abandon using any real star names such as Deneb in his stories.
 Blake's 7 (1978-1981), television series created and mostly written by Terry Nation. Roj Blake, a political dissident is arrested, tried and convicted on false charges and deported to the prison planet Cygnus Alpha. He and two fellow prisoners commandeer an abandoned alien spacecraft, rescue two more prisoners and are joined by an alien guerrilla with telepathic abilities. The group conducts an ineffectual campaign against the totalitarian Terran Federation. Similar to Star Wars in its theme of free spirited rebels versus the oppressive empire, the series is notably different in tone: the rebels are quarrelsome, depressive, pessimistic, cynical.
 Hyperion (1989), first novel in the Hyperion Cantos series by Dan Simmons. Humanity has spread across the galaxy, and makes profligate, casual use of farcaster technology to travel instantly between any two points in space (to its ultimate rue). Deneb Drei (Deneb III, in German) and Deneb Vier (Deneb IV) are inhabited planets in the Deneb system.
 The Rowan (1990), and other novels in "The Tower and the Hive" series by Anne McCaffrey. Jeff Raven is a native of Deneb VIII, home to a large population of untrained "Wild Talents"

Dorsum (Theta Capricorni)
 Tékumel (~1940–), novels and games by M. A. R. Barker. Dorsum is the home sun of the Mihálli, or Shape-Shifters.

Ensis (Eta Orionis)
 Tékumel (~1940–), novels and games by M. A. R. Barker. Ensis is the home sun of the Hláka, or Furred Flyers.

 

Epsilon Canis Majoris
This star appears as a physical character in the 2007 animated film, Nocturna, as the main character Tim's favourite star.

Epsilon Eridani (Ran) 
 Dorsai! (1960, also published as The Genetic General), and other novels in the unfinished Childe Cycle by Gordon R. Dickson. Donal Graeme, a warrior extraordinaire from the mercenary homeworld Dorsai, and second incarnation of the series' evolutionary superman, launches his meteoric military career with service in several police actions on the vividly drawn planets Harmony and Association lying under the small orange Epsilon Eridani sun (see graphic).
 The Napoleons of Eridanus (1976), The Emperor of Eridanus (1983), and The Eridani Colonists (1984), a French language trilogy written by Claude Pierre Marie Avice, as by Pierre Barbet. A squadron of Napoleonic soldiers is kidnapped by aliens and hustled off to the Epsilon Eridani system, whence they unaccountably conquer a space empire.
 Starquake (1989), a novel by Robert Forward. Dragon's Egg, a neutron star, has wandered into the vicinity of the Solar System and into the ken of Earth scientists. It has some "dazzling" statistics: a surface gravity 67 billion times that of the Earth, soaring mountains as high as a few inches, ruinous starquakes, and tiny intelligent inhabitants whose life processes are accelerated over ours by a factor of almost half a million. Over a period of a day, human observers inadvertently introduce the rudiments of civilization, and within a man's lifetime the "immensely enjoyable" alien cheela have lived a whole history, progressing even to interstellar exploration and leaving the secrets of FTL travel stashed in a conspicuous landmark on a planet of Epsilon Eridani—as a reward for a humanity enterprising enough to get there.
 Worldwar (1994–1996), a tetralogy of novels written by Harry Turtledove. In this revised history, an Earth in the throes of World War II is invaded by a fleet of starships assembled for the purpose by The Race. Only three times in its 50,000-year history has this expansionist species of reptilian aliens organized such an armada, each time with the goal of subduing another civilization: the Rabotev (inhabitants of Epsilon Eridani), the Halessi, and now humanity. However, the invaders are in for a surprise, as their most recent intelligence on the Earth dates from the Middle Ages. Alternate world stories are a specialty of historian Turtledove, whose "thorough understanding of his source material gracefully infiltrates the fun and fantastication."
 The Babylon 5 station is in orbit around Epsilon III, the third planet orbiting Epsilon Eridani.

Epsilon Gruis
 Star Control II (1992), computer game developed by Toys for Bob and published by Accolade. The Spathi call this star Yuffo, and hail from Epsilon Gruis I, which they call Spathiwa. Ever since Spathiwa was infested with creatures known only as Evil Ones, they have instead resided on its moon known to humans as Epsilon Gruis I-A.

Epsilon Indi
 "And the Children Shall Lead" (1966), episode of Star Trek: The Original Series written by Edward J. Lakso. Epsilon Indi is the home system of an evil energy being known as Gorgan.
 Protector (1973), Known Space novel written by Larry Niven. Home is one of Earth's most distant colonies, the second planet of the star Epsilon Indi. The planet was so named by the colonists due to its remarkable similarity to Earth. Its day is nearly 24 hours long, its surface gravity is 1.08 g, and so on.
 Star Fleet Technical Manual (1975), fiction reference book by Franz Joseph Schnaubelt. Epsilon Indi's "Star Empire" is one of the five founding signatories of the United Federation of Planets' original Articles of Federation. The same book also places Andoria, homeworld to the Andorians, in this star system.
 "The Child" (1988), episode of Star Trek: The Next Generation written by Jon Povill et al. Wesley Crusher describes Epsilon Indi while wistfully looking out the window of the show's recreational area, Ten-Forward. (although Epsilon Indi, being a K-type main-sequence star, probably would not be visible from the Enterprise's current location, presumably hundreds of light-years away from Earth) 
 Full Thrust (1991–), miniatures war game written by Jon Tuffley and published by Ground Zero Games. Epsilon Indi is one of the three star systems of New Israel.
 Worldwar (1994–1996), series of four novels by Harry Turtledove. "The Race" is an alien reptilian species that already controls two subject worlds, and that initiates a poorly conceived invasion of the Earth during the years of our own second World War. The Race's subject worlds, populated by similar reptilians, are Epsilon Eridani II (q.v.) and Epsilon Indi I, known as Rabotev 2 and Halless 1 to The Race.
 Space: Above and Beyond (1995–1996), television series created by Glen Morgan and James Wong. In early 2063, The Chigs declare war on humanity, launching what appears to be an unprovoked first-strike against the budding interstellar colonies of Vespa and Tellus. The colonies are destroyed and their few survivors taken prisoner. The Epsilon Indi system is the site of the Tellus colony.

 Starplex (1996), novel by Robert Sawyer. "It had been like a gift from the gods: the discovery that the Milky Way galaxy was permeated by a vast network of artificial shortcuts that allowed for instantaneous journeys between star systems." The closest shortcut portals to the Earth are at Tau Ceti, and at New New York on Epsilon Indi III, a mere 11.2 light-years out.
 The Armies of Memory (2006), fourth in the series of four Thousand Cultures novels by John Barnes. In this novel Epsilon Indi is orbited by the planet Roosevelt, home to 92 cultures, including the francophone Trois-Orléans.
 Halo: Contact Harvest (2007), novel set in the Halo universe and written by Joseph Staten. Humanity has spread across the galaxy, and the outer colony planet Harvest in the Epsilon Indi system is one of the most remote. Although Harvest itself is only one-third the size of Earth, its fertile surface serves as the breadbasket for other colonies. Harvest is the first human world attacked by the theocratic alliance of aliens known as the Covenant—which sets the basic conflict of the entire Halo series in motion.
 Frontier: Elite II (1993) and Frontier: First Encounters (1995), computer games written by David Braben et al. Epsilon Indi is an important Federation system that includes two terraformed worlds, an economy based on agriculture and cattle ranching and a population of several billions.

Epsilon Ophiuchi
 In Frank Herbert's Dune series, Epsilon Ophiuchi (as Epsilon Alangue) is the host star to the planet Poritrin.

Epsilon Pegasi (Enif)
 FreeSpace 2 (1999), combat simulation computer game designed by Dave Baranec et al., and published by Volition. Epsilon Pegasi is the site of a major outpost of the Galactic Terran Vasudan Alliance and the location of Enif Station. The Rebellion of the Neo-Terran Front threatens the Epsilon Pegasi system, and requires that Enif Station be reinforced.

Epsilon Scorpii (Larawag)
 Star Control II (1992), computer game developed by Toys for Bob and published by Accolade. Epsilon Scorpii I is the homeworld of the Mycon, revered by them as the "Source of Juffo-Wup".

Epsilon Tauri
 Epsilon Tauri is a major feature of the book Starsong Chronicles:Exodus, by American author JJ Clayborn. In the book, the star is referenced by the name Ain, but the characters rename the star Coronis.

 In Fred Saberhagen's Berserker series in the short story Patron of the Arts (first appeared in Worlds of If, Aug 1965), the Earth-Descended peoples place all of humanity's important artworks on an evacuation starship to preserve the works by sending them to Tau Epsilon.

Eta Boötis (Mufrid)
 The Great Fetish (1978), novel by L. Sprague de Camp. The earthlike planet Kforri (K-40) has been settled by colonists from Earth who, cut off from their home world, have reverted to barbarism. A thousand years after settlement they are rediscovering the sciences, but are philosophically divided between church-sanctioned Evolutionism, which holds that they evolved from lower animals on Kforri but owe their civilization to gods from the heavenly realm of "Earth," and the "heresy" of Descentionism, according to which Earth is a physical world from which their ancestors came. The truth is said to be tied to the "Great Fetish" preserved on a forbidden island by a society of witches. When protagonist Marko Prokopiu is blown to the island in an experimental balloon, the Great Fetish is discovered to consist of microcards preserving both the scientific knowledge and literature of Earth.
 Star Carrier: Earth Strike (2010), novel by William H. Keith, Jr. writing as Ian Douglas.  The star is a binary system consisting of a yellow sun and an orbiting white dwarf, and has fourteen planets, the fourth of which, dubbed Al Haris al Sama (Arabic for "Guardian of Heaven"), was colonized by an Islamic faction from Earth.  It comes under attack by an alien race called the Turusch and a Terran Confederation battle group led by the eponymous carrier America is sent to evacuate the Marine base and as many colonists as possible.  The battle group initially drives off the Turusch, but they return and destroy the colony with long-range mass driver strikes.

Eta Cassiopeiae (Achird)
 Frontier: Elite II (1993) and Frontier: First Encounters (1995), computer games written by David Braben et al. The Eta Cassiopeiae system includes three trojan planets on one orbit. The Federation has its main naval base and fleet academies in this system.
 "Terra Nova" (2001), episode of Star Trek: Enterprise written by Rick Berman and Brannon Braga. The first extra-solar human colony was on the planet Terra Nova. The fictional reference book Star Trek Star Charts (2002) identifies Terra Nova as "Eta Cassiopeia III" (with the Latin nominative instead of genitive case).
 The Merchants of Souls (2002), third in the series of four Thousand Cultures novels by John Barnes. In this novel Hedon, a pleasure planet where the protagonist Giraut Leones goes on vacation, orbits Eta Cassiopeiae.
 Dave Smeds' "The War of the Dragons" series takes place on Tanagaran, an Earth-like moon orbiting a gas giant (Motherworld)  which orbits a star called Achird. This star has an orange companion that is visible during the day known as the Sister, but it is not made explicit if this is in fact Eta Cassiopeiae.
 The Blue-Spangled Blue (2021), first book in the space opera The Path by David Bowles. This novel takes place on the planet Jitsu, which orbits Eta Cassiopeiae (renamed Higante by the human inhabitants of Jitsu).

Eta Pegasi (Matar)
 Starliners: Commercial Travel in 2200 AD (1980), a Terran Trade Authority book by Stewart Cowley. Eta Pegasi hosts a system of three planets; in 2218, a Terran Trade Authority (TTA) team surveyed the Eta Pegasi system and found Eta Pegasi II & III to be lifeless, but Eta Pegasi I was found to be ideal for the production of food due to the planet's rich soil and vast prairies, and was named Newbraska. Newbraska Co-operative Spacelines was founded in 2239 to transport businessmen, farmers, tourists & foods to and from Newbraska.

 Eta Ursae Majoris (Alkaid) 
 In the Nintendo DS game Devil Survivor 2, Benetnasch appears as the last of the Septentriones, a series of strange beings that invade Japan throughout the game. The other six are also named after stars in the Big Dipper (Dubhe, Merak, Phecda, Megrez, Alioth, Mizar).
 The role-playing video game trilogy .hack//G.U. has the character Alkaid, who is named after the star.

Fomalhaut (Alpha Piscis Austrini)
 Pebble in the Sky (1950), novel by Isaac Asimov. Joseph Schwartz of Chicago is transported by a stray beam of radiation to the Earth of the far future, which is part of a galactic empire ruled from the planet Trantor. Finding himself in a wild countryside, he searches far and wide for help until he stumbles upon a cottage—only he can't understand the dwellers, nor they him. One of them theorizes, "He must come from some far-off corner of the Galaxy ... They say the men of Fomalhaut have to learn practically a new language to be understood at the Emperor's court on Trantor." Asimov would later substantially abandon using any real star names at all in the empire.
 "The Dead Lady of Clown Town" (1964), short story by Cordwainer Smith. The planet Fomalhaut III is the site of the martyrdom of D'Joan,) an event that "makes the worlds reel".

Gamma Draconis (Etamin / Eltanin)
 Planet of Exile (1966), novel by Ursula K. Le Guin. This novel takes place on Werel, the third planet of Gamma Draconis.  It is also known as Alterra. The planet has an orbital period of 60 Earth years, and is approaching its correspondingly long winter. The main characters belong to one of two major groups: the Tevarans, a tribe of humanoid extraterrestrials indigenous to the planet, and a dwindling colony of Earth humans who detest them, marooned on the planet in their stone city Landin. Alterra's prodigiously extended seasons afford Le Guin ample scope to pursue her favorite narrative theme: a man is set in an alien world; he must pursue a frozen winter quest until he makes a conceptual breakthrough; he then becomes an agent of reconciliation between former antagonists.

Gamma Andromedae (Almach)
 Uranie (1889), novel by Camille Flammarion. In his dream, the protagonist visits a planet in the Gamma Andromedae system inhabited by androgynous dragonfly-like creatures.
 Foundation (1951), novel by Isaac Asimov. A catastrophic nuclear reactor meltdown occurred on Gamma Andromeda V in the year 50 F.E. The meltdown killed several million people and destroyed at least half the planet.
 The Five Gold Bands (1953), novel by Jack Vance. A planet of Almach is one of five sites of a treasure-hunt with profound consequences. (The star's multiplicity is not mentioned.)
 Bugaboo (The Flea) (1983), video game by Paco&Paco.

Gamma Cassiopeiae
 In the O. Henry short story The Skylight Room, Gamma Cassiopeiae is named "Billy Jackson".

Gamma Crateris
 Star Trek Online (2009), video game by Cryptic Studios. Located in the game's Azure Sector, a planet in this system referred to as Crateris was the site of a failed Romulan colony. Before the supernova of 2387 destroyed the Romulan-Reman home star system, the Romulan Star Empire granted this planet to a faction of Remans as part of a peace agreement. The colony still stands when the game begins in 2409, but is attacked by the Tal Shiar and Elachi during the Romulan Republic storyline.

Gamma Draconis (Etamin / Eltanin)
 Planet of Exile (1966), novel by Ursula K. Le Guin. This novel takes place on Werel, the third planet of Gamma Draconis.  It is also known as Alterra. The planet has an orbital period of 60 Earth years, and is approaching its correspondingly long winter. The main characters belong to one of two major groups: the Tevarans, a tribe of humanoid extraterrestrials indigenous to the planet, and a dwindling colony of Earth humans who detest them, marooned on the planet in their stone city Landin. Alterra's prodigiously extended seasons afford Le Guin ample scope to pursue her favorite narrative theme: a man is set in an alien world; he must pursue a frozen winter quest until he makes a conceptual breakthrough; he then becomes an agent of reconciliation between former antagonists.
 The Last Castle (1966), novella by Jack Vance. Etamin IX (Etamin being one of the traditional names for Gamma Draconis) is the planet of origin of both the Meks and the power-wagons, two of the species who are servants to aristocratic humanity.
 Master of Orion II (1996), strategy game developed by Simtex and published by MicroProse/MacSoft. Gamma Draconis is the Elerian home system.
 FreeSpace 2 (1999), combat simulation computer game designed by Dave Baranec et al., and published by Volition Despite being an unpopulated system, Gamma Draconis plays a central role in the Galactic Terran Vasudan Alliance's second war against the xenophobic Shivans. It is the location of the first Knossos Device (a subspace portal designed by the Ancients) discovered by humanity, in the year 2367. The remote node of the portal is located in the Nebula, remnant of the supernova that destroyed the Ancients' civilization.

Gamma Hydrae
 In the television show Star Trek: The Original Series, the starship Enterprise visits a planet named Gamma Hydrae IV in the episode "The Deadly Years". Within the same fictional setting, a region of space designated "Section 10" of Gamma Hydrae lies within a demilitarized area called the Klingon Neutral Zone. This comes into play during the Kobayashi Maru scenario depicted in the film Star Trek II: The Wrath of Khan In the first Star Trek: Discovery episode, "The Vulcan Hello", it is stated to be six light-years away from a binary star system where the first battle of the Federation–Klingon War of 2256–2257 is fought.

Gamma Leporis
 In the Star Trek universe (1966–), Gamma Leporis is the home star of the unnamed Lorillian homeworld.
 Gamma Leporis is one of the six star systems in the Star Trader board game (1982) set in SPI's Universe role-playing game. The others are Beta Hydri, Epsilon Eridani, Mu Herculis, Sigma Draconis, and Tau Ceti.

Gamma Orionis (Bellatrix)
 Babel-17 (1966), novel by Samuel R. Delany. Bellatrix is the star system of the Alliance War Yards at Armsedge, where Rydra Wong witnesses a berserker attack by an Invader agent controlled by the weapon/language Babel-17. The author's vividly kaleidoscopic descriptions of Armsedge, and the fateful banquet set-piece where the assassin runs amok, are instances of recurring themes in Delany's work: the quest (here, to decode and disarm Babel-17), a damaged protagonist (Wong), and an economical use of colorful detail to flesh out the social background of his stories (the remarkable Armsedge itself). Presumably the planet's name "Armsedge" derives from Bellatrix' (Gamma Orionis') situation at the outer edge of the Orion arm of the Milky Way galaxy, with an additional war-yard play on the word arms.
 Planet of the Apes (1968), film written by Michael Wilson and Rod Serling, and directed by Franklin J. Schaffner. Three astronauts have landed on an unknown world: Commander George Taylor (Charlton Heston) states, "We're some 320 light years from Earth on an unnamed planet in orbit around a star in the constellation of Orion." The crew speculates that they may be stranded in the Bellatrix (Gamma Orionis) system.
 Blade Runner (1982), film written by Hampton Fancher and David Peoples and directed by Ridley Scott, loosely based on the novel Do Androids Dream of Electric Sheep? by Philip K. Dick. Betelgeuse is the right shoulder, and Bellatrix is the left shoulder of the constellation Orion. In his "Tears in the rain" soliloquy, the dying replicant Roy Batty, tells of "attack ships on fire off the shoulder of Orion". See also Betelgeuse in fiction.
 Harry Potter (1997–2007), fantasy novels written by J. K. Rowling. Bellatrix Lestrange was a Death Eater, she was from the Black family, Lestrange by marriage. Members of the Black family were commonly named after stars.

Gamma Serpentis
 Star Control II (1992), computer game developed by Toys for Bob and published by Accolade. Gamma Serpentis I is the homeworld of the Yehat, home to the High Perch of Caer Zeep-Reep, from which the Veep-Neep Queen rules the Yehat Clans. During the course of the game, the player can start a civil war by convincing the Starship Clans that the Queen's decision to join the Ur-Quan hierarchy was dishonorable, causing them to rebel against the Homeworld Clans and depose the Veep-Neeps.

Gamma Trianguli
 "The Apple" (1967), episode of Star Trek: The Original Series written by Max Ehrlich and directed by Joseph Pevney. The planet Gamma Trianguli VI is visited by the USS Enterprise; at first blush it appears to be a tropical paradise, but it is an elaborate illusion held in place by an entity—perhaps an artificial intelligence left behind by an ancient alien race—worshipped by the local primitives as Vaal. Vaal opens a double pronged attack on the crew of the Enterprise, ambushing the survey team on the ground with assaults by poisonous plants and lightning bolts from the blue, and at the same time draining energy from the ship and pulling it down with a tractor beam. The surviving planetside crew counterattack and destroy Vaal with phasers, leaving the native populace sadder but wiser, having been force-fed the eponymous apple of knowledge of good and evil (Gen. 2:16–17).

Gamma Ursae Minoris (Pherkad)

 Pherkad (spelled as Pherkard) features in Cthulhu Mythos, in the short story "The Thing in the Library", by Crispin Burnham and E.P. Berglund. It is also mentioned as the stellar abode of the flaming Outer God Yomagn'tho.
	
 In the GameCube game, Baten Kaitos, Pherkad is the name of the capitol city of the region of Sadal Suud, also named after a star.

GK Persei (Nova Persei 1901)
This nova figures in the plot of H. P. Lovecraft's short story "Beyond the Wall of Sleep".

Gliese 581 (GJ 581, Wolf 562)Gliese 581d is a known (but unconfirmed) exoplanet that was the setting of the Doctor Who episode Smile. The planet was the site of one of humanity's earliest colonies following the evacuation of the Earth.
Gliese 581 appeared in the eighth episode of the space opera Anime Star Blazers: Space Battleship Yamato 2199, where the Yamato found itself trapped between the star and a gas-based biological weapon.
Wolfgang Herrndorf's novel Sand refers to Gliese 581d as the character Helen Gliese is assigned a bungalow with the number 581d in a Moroccan holiday resort.

Gliese 687 (GJ 687)
 Revelation Space universe (2000–), novels and stories by Alastair Reynolds. The planet Haven, one of the Demarchist polities, orbits Gliese 687.

Gliese 710
 Gliese 710 is the name of a song in the 2022 King Gizzard & the Lizard Wizard album Ice, Death, Planets, Lungs, Mushrooms and Lava.

Gliese 754
 Murasaki (1992), shared universe novel written by several Nebula Award winners and edited by Robert Silverberg. The scenery is set in a fictional double planet system with Genji and Chujo orbiting Gliese 754 about 20 light-years from the Solar System. The system was first explored by a Japanese robot interstellar probe, and the star has been given the proper name Murasaki.

Gliese 876 (Ross 780)
Item(s) in this section refer to the star as Gliese 876. For references to Ross 780, see the separate section in this article. As of 2013, it has been confirmed that four (nonfictional) extrasolar planets orbit the star.
 Building Harlequin's Moon (2005), novel by Larry Niven and Brenda Cooper. A group of space travellers, marooned in the inhospitable planetary system of Gliese 876, attempt to terraform a moon of the gas giant Harlequin, aiming to create over a span of many generations a sufficient technological base to refuel their ship and press on to their original destination.
The star system was also featured in Cargo for Gliese 876 the story of mankind fighting for survival against an ant-based race called the Xyloids.

Gliese 1061 (LHS 1565)
 A Path in the Darkness (2015), novel by M.D. Cooper. The Earth colony ship Intrepid is sabotaged and crippled passing LHS 1565 in an attempt to crash it into the star and destroy it. The crew names the star Estrella de la Muerte (Spanish for "star of death"), which becomes a permanent moniker.

Gliese 3707 (LHS 2520)
In September 2011, The New 52 rebooted DC's continuity. In this new timeline, Rao, the primary star of the planet Krypton, home of Superman and Supergirl, is identified as the red dwarf star LHS 2520, aka Gliese 3707, lying approximately 42 light years away. However, see Arcturus above.

Groombridge 34
 Downbelow Station (1981) and other Alliance-Union universe works, novels by C. J. Cherryh. Groombridge 34 is the location of a minor space station in the so-called "Hinder Stars": Olympus Station.
 Frontier: Elite II (1993), Frontier: First Encounters (1995) and Elite: Dangerous (2014), computer games written by David Braben et al. The crowded Groombridge 34 stellar system has three stars, multiple gas giants and numerous terrestrial planets. It is also heavily developed, with a large number of colonies and space stations.
 Macross Plus (1994), original video animation and anime film written by Keiko Nobumoto and directed by Shōji Kawamori and Shinichirō Watanabe. Groombridge 34 is a possible location of the fictitious "Groombridge 1816" (Helios) system, stated to be 11.7 light-years from the Solar System, about the same as the actual distance to Groombridge 34 (11.62 ly). The planet Eden in the fictional 1816 system is the location of the New Edwards Test Flight Center and its major metropolis, Eden City. The name Groombridge 1816 may be an alteration of the name of the actual although unrelated star Groombridge 1618 (see next entry).
 "Pilot, Part 1" and "Mutiny" (1995), first and fourth episodes of Space: Above and Beyond, a television series created by Glen Morgan and James Wong. Groombridge 34 is the location of the largest extrasolar USMC fleet base, mistakenly believed to be the target of a massive attack by the alien Chigs, and seen under sniper fire in "Mutiny".
 Halo (2001–), video game franchise created by Bungie and published by Microsoft Game Studios. The Groombridge 34 system is the location of a decommissioned construction platform. In 2531, a group of Spartan-IIs are sent to investigate rebel activity at the platform. One of the Spartans, Kurt-051, is declared MIA, when the entire mission was a setup created by ONI's Beta-5 Division to recruit Kurt as an instructor for the classified SPARTAN-III program.
 The Black Hole Project (2013) by C. Sanford Lowe and G. David Nordley.  In the novel, Groombridge 34A is one of the stars launching an impactor to make the mini-black hole.  It is also the site of an almost terraformed colony planet named New Antarctica.

Groombridge 1618
 New Arcadia, (1956), novelette by L. Sprague de Camp. Turania, a planet orbiting Groombridge 1618, is the site of two Terran Utopian communities menaced by a similar settlement established by an alien species.
 Father of the Stars, (1964), short story by Frederik Pohl.  Groombridge 1618 is one of the destinations of the colony ships traveling at sub-light speeds, sent by millionaire Norman Marchand, who lives long enough to see a faster-than-light drive developed so that the expedition can be overtaken.  He dies on the colony planet.
 Mindbridge (1976), novel by Joe Haldeman. A planet orbiting Groombridge 1618 is the homeworld of the psi-amplifying Groombridge Bridge. It is accessible from the Earth (less than 16 light-years away), using the instantaneous space transport mechanism called the Levant-Meyer Translation.
 Frontier: Elite II (1993) and Frontier: First Encounters (1995), computer games written by David Braben et al. The Groombridge 1618 planetary system can be visited in the Frontier series, but it is uninhabited.
 "The Heroic Myth of Lt. Nora Argamentine" (1994), short story written by Donald Kingsbury as a contribution to the Known Space universe created by Larry Niven. The colony planet W'kkai of the Kzin Empire orbits this star. In the story the star is referred to as "Gliese 380", another of its designations.
 Calculating God (2000), novel by Robert J. Sawyer. Virtual beings from a planet orbiting Groombridge 1618 engineer the supernova of Betelgeuse to sterilize the stellar neighborhood. The event threatens the survival of humanity, as well as that of two recently allied extraterrestrial races, the Wreeds and the Forhilnors.
 Revelation Space universe (2000–), novels and stories by Alastair Reynolds. The planet Turquoise, a Pattern Juggler world, orbits Groombridge 1618. It is home to a primitive human civilization almost entirely cut off from the rest of humanity.
 The Stringship Trilogy (2017 to 2022) by BJ Creighton follows the peregrinations of Horse Cooke as he discovers the first extraterrestrial intelligent beings on a planet of Grombridge 1618, Groomby.  In the second and third (not yet published) parts of the trilogy he brings an ambassador from Groomby to Earth and is arrested by the tax service.

HD 102365
 The couch gag for Bart's Not Dead in the television series The Simpsons has an alien family sitting on a couch in this star system. The adult male alien asks why Homer sounds like Walter Matthau.

HD 182681
 Rise: The Vieneo Province (2006–), online virtual world developed and published by Unistellar Industries, LLC. This MMORPG takes place on an exomoon of the Yonmaran system.

HIP 56948
 The collaborative fiction project SCP Foundation features SCP-3003, an Earth-like planet orbiting HIP 56948 that is inhabited by a totalitarian society of "aliens" virtually identical to humans. All of the people are controlled by a species of parasite bacteria and its beetle-like hosts, which seek to invade Earth.

Iota Antliae
 Starliners: Commercial Travel in 2200 AD (1980), a Terran Trade Authority book by Stewart Cowley. Iota Antliae has a system of five planets, one of which is Phlorflath, the homeworld of the Phlorflathins, a spacefaring alien race that most other alien species find to be extremely revolting, due to the odor, telepathic abilities & physical repulsiveness of the Phlorflathins, who are not offended by the impulsive nauseous reactions of visitors. The Phlorflathins subsequently joined the Terran Federation, and to better facilitate their interactions with visitors, the Phlorflathins built artificially intelligent, sentient humanoid robots who serve as intermediaries & the crews of passenger liners operated by Antliae Robolines, founded in 2252. The Phlorflathins have contributed to the Federation by providing superior FTL communications equipment & a large spaceport orbiting their homeworld.

Iota Boötis
In Star Trek: Enterprise, this system is the home of Denobulans.

Iota Geminorum
In Star Trek canon, the fourth planet orbiting Iota Geminorum is the homeworld of the Tribbles.

Iota Horologii (Gliese 108)
 Halo (2001–), video game franchise created by Bungie and published by Microsoft Game Studios. Iota Horologii was believed to be the star referred to in the game series as Soell, which is orbited by Threshold, Basis, and the eponymous Installation 04.
 Iota Cycle (2006), novel by Russell Lutz. The Iota Horologii system is a setting for colonization and terraforming. In order of increasing orbital radius its six planets are named Australia, Asia, Europe, Africa, America, and Antarctica.

Iota Orionis
In the Star Trek franchise, Iota Leonis is represented twice. The reference book Star Trek: Star Charts gives Iota Leonis as the primary for Argelius II, a planet visited by the USS Enterprise in the TOS episode "Wolf in the Fold." A later novel in the Star Trek: Titan series, Fallen Gods by Michael A. Martin, says that Starbase 185 (referenced in TNG's "Q Who") is in the Iota Leonis system, and has facilities on the planet Iota Leonis II. These two references appear to be inconsistent with each other, despite the Titan era Star Trek novels typically adhering closely to the Star Charts map.

Iota Persei
The planet Grainne in the book Freehold, by Michael Z. Williamson, is described as orbiting Iota Persei.

Izar (Epsilon Boötis)
 "Whom Gods Destroy" (1969), episode of Star Trek: The Original Series written by Lee Erwin from a story by Lee Erwin and Jerry Sohl. The crew of the starship Enterprise arrives at the planet Elba II, an inhospitable world known for its poisonous atmosphere and underground asylum for the criminally insane. When they attempt to meet facility director Donald Cory, they discover that he is being impersonated by the now crazed Fleet Captain Garth of Izar, a famous starship captain and one of Kirk's personal heroes.
 Space Probe Epsilon (1974), German language novel (Raumsonde Epsilon) by Mark Brandis. This novel extrapolates the claim propounded by Duncan Lunan in 1973 that there was a space probe orbiting around the Moon, sent there by inhabitants of a planet in the Epsilon Boötis system.
 "All the World is Birthday Cake" (2019), episode of The Orville written by Seth MacFarlane. Lieutenant Talla Keyali notes the Janisi, a matriarchal species, as hailing from the Izar system.

Kappa Coronae Borealis
In Star Trek: The Next Generation (episode "Firstborn") and Star Trek: Deep Space Nine (episode "The Forsaken"), according to Star Trek: Star Charts, on the star chart labeled United Federation of Planets I, the Dopterians (an unscrupulous humanoid species found throughout the Alpha Quadrant) were from the Dopteria (Kappa Coronae Borealis) system. This system was located in the Alpha Quadrant.

Kapteyn's Star
 Frontier: Elite II (1993) and Frontier: First Encounters (1995), computer games written by David Braben et al. The Kapteyn's planetary system can be visited in the Frontier series, but it is uninhabited.
 Fallen Gods (2003), novella written by Jonathan Blum and Kate Orman based on the British science fiction television series Doctor Who. Kapteyn's Star is the sun of a planetary system whose planets are home to several dozen sentient species occupying a variety of terrestrial and aquatic ecological.
 Singularity (2012), novel written by William H. Keith, Jr. as by Ian Douglas. Studies of the proper motion of Kapteyn's star, and its composition, suggest that it comes from the Omega Centauri globular cluster, which in turn is so anomalous among clusters—having an atypical stellar population and high metallicity—that it is thought to be the stripped core of a dwarf satellite galaxy captured a hundreds of millions of years ago by the Milky Way. The Kapteyn's system contains the gas-giant Bifrost, whose arid and ruin-haunted moon Heimdall, with planetary scale computers nano-etched into its stones, appears to have been the home of a billion-year-old extragalactic super-civilization.
 "Sad Kapteyn" (2014), short story by Alastair Reynolds, published after the announced discovery of a planetary system around Kapteyn's Star.
 In the book Building Victoria, by M. D. Cooper, Kapteyn's Star is visited by the colony ship Intrepid on its way to a planned colony at New Eden (82 G. Eridani). Intrepid stops in the system for repairs after a misadventure in the previous book, and helps build a permanent colony on one of Kapteyn's planets for a shipload of escaped slaves fleeing the Sirius system. Kapteyn's Star is also trailed by a dark matter phenomenon called Kapteyn's Streamer. This phenomenon behaves like a wormhole, typically transporting ships that fly into it to the vicinity of Bollam's World (58 Eridani) and hundreds or even thousands of years into the future.

KOI-4878.01
 The planet candidate KOI-4878.01 appears in Tras el cielo de Urano, a novel written by Antonio José López Serrano. The convoy from Earth - destined to conquer the exoplanet KOI-4878-01 in the constellation of the Swan - suffers a spectacular accident while orbiting the planet Uranus. Captain Íñigo Cortés, one of the survivors of the expedition, takes the reins of his ship to guide the rest of the colonists, who are not resigned to returning to Earth.

Kruger 60 (DO Cephei)
 Downbelow Station (1981) and other Alliance-Union universe works, novels by C. J. Cherryh. Kruger 60 is the site of Venture Station, one of the stations on the "Great Circle" chain of space stations that terminates at Pell Station in the Tau Ceti system.
 In Alexander Kluge's film  (1972), a planet in the Kruger 60 system is the seat of the galaxy's administration and the high command of the 6th fleet.
The Kruger 60 system is the setting for "Destroyer of Worlds", an adventure for Alien: The Roleplaying Game written by Andrew E. C. Gaska.

Lacaille 9352
 The Trees of Verità (1999), a novella by Wolf Read published in Analog Science Fiction and Fact (June 1999). Verità is the Mars-sized moon of a Jovian planet that orbits within the habitable zone of Lacaille 9352, called Rubino in the story. The planet receives only 0.11 of the stellar irradiance than the Earth—this is offset by a massive, deep atmosphere and high geothermal heat flow. Titanic, million-year old immortal trees live on this world, capturing the fascination of a teenage girl seeking comfort from the realities of her own mortality, triggered by the loss of her mother back on Earth. A nearby type Ia supernova, contributing significant irradiance relative to that supplied by Rubino, has implications for the life on Verità and subsequently the protagonists.
 Revelation Space universe (2000–), novels and stories by Alastair Reynolds. Lacaille 9352 is the sun to the planet Fand, home of the Fand "screech mat".
 Shadeward Saga Universe  (2015–), novels and stories by Drew Wagar. Lacaille 9352 is the sun to the tidally locked planet Esurio.

Lalande 21185 (Gliese 411)
Lalande 21185 is a red dwarf of apparent magnitude 7 and is thus too dim to be seen with the unaided eye. However, at approximately 8.3 light-years away it is the fifth-closest stellar system to the Sun; only the Alpha Centauri system, Barnard's Star, Luhman 16 and Wolf 359 are known to be closer. thus the star has attracted the attention of science fiction authors and game developers. A number of claims have been made for the discovery by astrometry of one or more extrasolar planets in the Lalande 21185 system, but these are now in doubt.
 Rogue Queen (1951), novel by L. Sprague de Camp. On the planet of the star Lalande 21185 known to Terrans as Ormazd, the dominant humanoid species is organized into hive societies much like those of Earth's ants and bees. These societies are inadvertently but inevitably undermined and transformed by contact with Terrans.
 Lalande 21185 (1966), Polish language novel by Janusz Zajdel. Zajdel's dystopian themes of totalitarian states and collapsed societies are explored in the Lalande 21185 system.
 Star Light (1971), novel by Hal Clement.  The story takes place on the supergiant planet Dhrawn, which some suspect of being a failed star, in orbit around Lalande 21185. The gravity at the surface is 40 times the Earth's, and a Dhrawn day lasts 1500 Earth hours. A consortium of spacefaring races, including humans, recruits Mesklinites, the centipede-like natives of the high-gravity planet Mesklin (see 61 Cygni: Mission of Gravity above), to explore Dhrawn.
 Spacecraft 2000–2100 AD (1978), a Terran Trade Authority book by Stewart Cowley. In 2098, a group of prospectors discovered a derelict alien spacecraft of unknown origin on the surface of the sole planet orbiting Lalande 21185, but were unable to closely examine the derelict due to high levels of radiation surrounding the vessel. The prospectors found evidence that some of the aliens had survived the crash, but had apparently died of radiation sickness. The intact forward portion of the alien ship still has power, as artificial lights are still in working order. 
 Across the Sea of Suns (1984), novel in the Galactic Center Saga by Gregory Benford. Radio astronomy on the Moon in 2021 reveals the presence of life in the system of nearby red dwarf star Lalande 21185, on the tidally locked planet Isis. An expedition is dispatched which discovers a primitive race of alien nomads broadcasting en-masse with organs adapted to emit and receive electromagnetic radiation. The biotic basis of the transmissions is emblematic of Benford's vision in his "water-themed" novels of a Universe-wide struggle between organic lifeforms and self-replicating machines.
 Marooned in Realtime (1986), novel by Vernor Vinge. A character has returned from an expedition to Lalande 21185, referred to in the novel as "Gatewood's Star" after astronomer George G. Gatewood, a pioneer in the search for extrasolar planets by astrometry who in 1996 claimed to have detected planets orbiting Lalande 21185.
 Timemaster (1992), novel by Robert L. Forward. Three astronauts make the slow sub-lightspeed trip to Lalande 21185 between 2043 and 2052 with the intention of establishing a wormhole terminus, enabling instantaneous travel to and from the Earth.
 Frontier: Elite II (1993) and Frontier: First Encounters (1995), computer games written by David Braben et al. Lalande 21185 is dedicated to heavy industry. With a colony on the innermost planet of the system and a space station orbiting the planet, this industry-based system is more developed than most others in the games.
 Civilization II: Test of Time (1999), strategy game developed by MicroProse and published by Hasbro Interactive. Humans and an alien species both crashland on the earthlike second planet of Lalande 21185, Funestis. The object of play is to get back to Earth. Other planets in this system include rocky Naumachia and the gas giant Nona.
 Revelation Space universe (2000–), novels and stories by Alastair Reynolds. Lalande 21185 is the sun of the planet Zion. Little is known of this planet, save the fact that contact with it was lost during the Human-Inhibitor war.
 Escape Velocity Nova (2002), computer game developed and published by Ambrosia Software. Lalande 21185 is an important crossroads, and features the minor planet Diva.
 Star Corps (2006), first novel in the Legacy Trilogy by Ian Douglas. The gas giant planet Marduk in orbit around Lalande 21185 has the earthlike moon Ishtar, where the alien race of Ahannu holds humans in slavery, resulting in a force of US Marines being sent in 2148 to free them.

Lalande 46650
 Cyteen (1988) and Regenesis (2009), novels in the Alliance-Union universe by C. J. Cherryh. Lalande 46650 is the star system containing the planet Cyteen as well as a space station with the same name. Cyteen is the home planet of the ruthless, expansionist Union, and Cherryh limns its intricacies with plays on genetics, identity, family, and power. These novels go against type for her in that they are planet-centric rather than being set in artificial environments in space. They can also be seen to represent a shift from themes of honor (typical of preliterate "shame" cultures) to the responsibility of power (a problem central to literate "guilt" cultures).

Lambda Scorpii (Shaula)
 The Transformers (2005–), comic book series written by Simon Furman et al. for IDW Publishing. Cybertron is the homeworld of the Transformers in the various fictional incarnations of the Transformer metaseries (Marvel, Dreamwave, IDW). In the IDW comics, Cybertron orbits Lambda Scorpii and has been rendered largely uninhabitable by war. While Transformers can survive on the surface, they cannot live there indefinitely.

Lambda Serpentis
 In The Big Hunger (short story by Walter M Miller), Lambda Serpentis is the first extrasolar planet colonized by men.
 Blue Planet (1997, 2000), two releases of a pencil-and-paper role playing game designed by Jeff Barber et al., and published by Biohazard Games (v1) and Fantasy Flight Games (v2). Just before a worldwide ecological catastrophe devastates the Earth, space explorers discover that Lambda Serpentis II is a habitable ocean planet; they give it the name Poseidon. One major colony ship is sent before civilization collapses on Earth.
 Halo (2001–), video game franchise created by Bungie and published by Microsoft Game Studios. The Lambda Serpentis system is home to the human colony planet Jericho VII.
 "Acquisition" (2002), episode of Star Trek: Enterprise written by Rick Berman and Brannon Braga. The episode makes reference to the planet Stameris. The fictional reference book Star Trek Star Charts (2002) depicts Lambda Serpentis as a binary star with two class G components, and identifies it as the location of Stameris.

 Luyten's Star 
 In Larry Niven's Known Space stories, Luyten's Star is Down's primary (known as "L5 1668", almost certainly a corrupted form of the BD+05°1668 designation).The front cover illustration of Tales of Known Space: The Universe of Larry Niven, Del Rey, 1975 (at least 10 printings), has this as "L5-1665".
 In Michael McCollum's Antares series, Luyten's Star is the destination of the first foldpoint transition from Sol.
 According to secondary materials, in Star Trek: Enterprise, a planet in Luyten's Star's system is the location of a Vulcan monastery named P'Jem.Star Trek: Star Charts, Page 45

Maia (20 Tauri)
 Mary Poppins (1934) features a scene where Mary Poppins and the Banks children go Christmas shopping with the star Maia.
 Operation Bororo (1973), Czechoslovak science fiction film written by I. Drahnovská et al. and directed by Otakar Fuka. A man and a woman (Ori-Ana) from a planet orbiting Maia come to the Earth to get a cure for a disease that threatens to eradicate their civilization, a drug made only by the Amazonian Bororó people.
 Elite: Dangerous (2014-), space-flight simulation video game developed and published by Frontier Developments. The Maia system is central to the storyline concerning Thargoids, the fictional alien race of the Elite video game series. It also contains the fictional black hole, Maia B.

Markab / Markeb (Kappa Velorum/Alpha Pegasi)
 Tékumel (~1940–), novels and games by M. A. R. Barker. Markeb is the home sun of the Hokún, or Glass Monsters.

Mintaka (Delta Orionis)
 Cluster (1977–1982), series of novels written by Piers Anthony. Mintaka, like the Earth ("Sol") is the center of a galactic sphere of influence. Melody of Mintaka, a direct descendant of Flint of Outworld and his Andromedan nemesis, is a major character in the second and third books of the series.
 "Who Watches the Watchers" (1989), episode of Star Trek: The Next Generation written by Richard Manning and Hans Beimler. Mintaka III is inhabited by the Mintakans, a preindustrial Vulcan-like race that is under observation by the Federation.
 "Durka Returns" (1999), episode 15 of the television series Farscape. Mintaka III is home to the Nebari, a race that sees violence and nonconformity as unacceptable traits that should be involuntarily excised. In the episode, a collision with a Nebari ship brings a Nebari "criminal" named Chiana to the Leviathan ship Moya. Despite the name, given that the Uncharted Territories are implied to be much farther away, it is almost certainly not a reference to the real-world star Mintaka.
 Baten Kaitos: Eternal Wings and the Lost Ocean (2003), video game developed by tri-Crescendo and Monolith Soft and published by Namco. Mintaka is the capital of the Alfard Empire.
 Baten Kaitos Origins (2006), video game developed by tri-Crescendo and Monolith Soft and published by Nintendo. Mintaka is the capital of the Alfard Empire.

Mira (Omicron Ceti)

Mira is a binary star system that consists of a red giant (Mira A) losing mass to its partner, the high temperature white dwarf companion (Mira B) steadily accreting substance from the primary. Mira A, a variable star, would actually be a poor candidate for the home sun of any of the "habitable" planets described below, since its brightness fluctuates over the long run by a total factor of around 1700, with each individual cycle lasting about 300 days. In 2007, observations showed a protoplanetary disc around the companion, Mira B. This disc is being accreted from material in the solar wind from Mira and could eventually form new planets.
 The War against the Rull (1959), fixup assembled by A. E. van Vogt. Protagonist Trevor Jamieson, chief scientist of the Interstellar Military Commission, is instantly hypnotized when he inadvertently glances at an intricate mandala inscribed with fine scratches in the enamel of his air car. Upon regaining awareness, he finds that Rull agents have transported him to Mira XXIII, a ravenous jungle world that is home to the dreaded progeny of the lymph beast. A beast-assisted assassination attempt on him follows (he escapes). The abrupt twist that places Jamieson on Mira XXIII is a dreamily disjointed non sequitur typical of van Vogt's plotting style; the astonishingly savage jungle in which the protagonist finds himself is a favored planetary setting of the author, and the second jungle world encountered in the novel (the first, Eristan II, orbits a fictional star).
 "A Relic of the Empire" (1966), Known Space short story by Larry Niven published in the collection Neutron Star (1968). Space pirates who have been raiding the Puppeteers' secret home system take refuge on a planet orbiting Mira, where they meet Dr. Richard Schultz-Mann and his Tnuctip relics. Red giant Mira A ("Big Mira") and white dwarf companion Mira B ("Little Mira") provide a spectacular diurnal display.
 "This Side of Paradise" (1967), episode of Star Trek: The Original Series written by D. C. Fontana. The Enterprise arrives at Omicron Ceti III, the site of a colony all of whose inhabitants are believed to have been killed by "Berthold rays". The crew is surprised to find the original colonists blissfully alive although behaving somewhat oddly.
The Among Us level, "MIRA HQ" and the recurring organization "MIRA" could be a reference to this. Although, this is yet to be confirmed by the game's developers.

Mirach (Beta Andromedae)
 Tékumel (~1940–), novels and games by M. A. R. Barker. Mirach is the home sun of the Ninín, or Little Ones.

Mizar (Zeta Ursae Majoris)
 Way Station (1963), novel by Clifford D. Simak. In the aftermath of the Civil War, protagonist Enoch Wallace is the secretly designated administrator of a way station for interstellar travel. He uses a mathematical model developed on Mizar to predict that the Earth will someday go to war and destroy itself in a nuclear holocaust.
 Star King (1964), "Demon Princes" novel by Jack Vance. Mizar VI is home to the Tunkers, a religious sect who are "ascetic, austere, devout to an astonishing degree. The men and women dress identically, shave their heads, use a language of eight hundred and twelve words, and eat identical meals at identical hours..."
 "On the Sand Planet" (1965), third novella in the collection Quest of the Three Worlds (1966) by Cordwainer Smith. The desert planet Mizzer, home of the Twelve Niles, is the last planet on protagonist Casher O'Neill's quest.
 BattleTech (1984), wargame and related products launched by The FASA Corporation. The Mizar system hosts a habitable planet noted for its luxurious resorts and vain inhabitants.
 Enigma (1986) and Empery (1987), second and third installments of The Trigon Disunity series of novels by Michael P. Kube-McDowell. The Mizar system is home to powerful, xenophobic aliens physically integrated into the geology of their planets. They react to threats with massive blasts of psychic energy, which they direct on occasion against the inhabited worlds of other species, light-years away.
 "Allegiance" (1990), episode of Star Trek: The Next Generation written by Richard Manning and Hans Beimler. Captain Picard, while sleeping in his quarters, is abducted by an unknown device. He awakes in a cell with three other prisoners including the philosopher Kovar Tholl from Mizar II. The residents of Mizar II are green humanoids who are committed pacifists.
 Frontier: Elite II (1993) and Frontier: First Encounters (1995), computer games written by David Braben et al. The Mizar planetary system can be visited in the Frontier series, but it is uninhabited.
 Forever Free (1999), novel written by Joe Haldeman as a sequel to The Forever War. Mizar is the home sun of the planet Middle Finger. Middle Finger is the coventry planet where the surviving veterans of the Forever War are sent when they discover that the war is over.
 "The Heart of the Star", chapter of The Sandman: Endless Nights (2003), a graphic novel written by Neil Gaiman and illustrated by Miguelanxo Prado. The story features a meeting of anthropomorphic stars, including a star with blue light named Mizar.
 "Sign in Stranger", the fifth track on the album The Royal Scam by Steely Dan, refers to conditions on Mizar V.
 In the Yu-Gi-Oh! Zexal anime, one of the Seven Barian Emperors is named Mizar.
 In the 1998 movie Deep Impact, Mizar and Alcor are the stars beside which a young astronomer discover a comet on a collision path to Earth.
In the video game Devil Survivor 2, and along with the anime adaptation of the same name, Mizar appears as a creature that is a part of a strange group of monsters known as the "Septentriones." Each member of the Septentriones are named after the eight stars that form the Big Dipper constellation and terrorize the cities of Tokyo, Nagoya, Osaka, and others, with one appearing each day under the orders of the game's main antagonist, Polaris. In Devil Survivor 2, Mizar features the ability to split other copies of itself when attacked, referring to the fact that it is a system of multiple stars.

Mu Capricorni
According to Star Trek: Star Charts, in Star Trek: The Motion Picture, Zaran (Mu Capricorni) was the name of a star in the Alpha Quadrant and it was the home of the Zaranites (a humanoid species known to the Federation during the mid-23rd century). The primary was a Class F star. Magnitude of this star was +5, which was the same brightness as Sol. This was a Federation system, with at least one planet being an affiliate.

Mu Cassiopeiae
 Emprise (1985), first installment of the Trigon Disunity series of novels by Michael P. Kube-McDowell. In a Luddite world, outcast astronomer Allen Chandliss struggles to maintain his primitive radio telescope, listening in secret for signs of intelligent life. After 17 years, he detects a repeating signal from an "alien intelligence" in Cassiopeia. The second novel of the series (Enigma) reveals that the "aliens" are actually human colonists residing on the planet Journa of Mu Cassiopeiae—out of touch with the Earth for the last 50,000 years.

Mu Herculis
 Mu Herculis is one of the six star systems in the Star Trader board game (1982) set in SPI's Universe role-playing game. The others are Beta Hydri, Epsilon Eridani, Gamma Leporis, Sigma Draconis, and Tau Ceti.

Nu Ophiuchi
 Tékumel (~1940–), novels and games by M. A. R. Barker. Nu Ophiuchi is the primary (Tuleng) of the planetary system that includes the planet Tékumel (also called Nu Ophiuchi d and Sinistra d). Tékumel is first settled by humans and several other alien species about 60,000 years in the future. Extensive terraforming of the planet's inhospitable environment, including changing its orbit and rotation to create a 365-day year, disrupts planetary ecologies and banishes most of the local flora and fauna (including some intelligent species) to small reservations in the corners of their own world, resulting in a golden age of technology and prosperity for humankind and its allies. Naturally enough, this halcyon era cannot last ...

Nu Pegasi
 Starman Jones (1953), one of the Heinlein juveniles by Robert A. Heinlein. Nu Pegasi VI, named Halcyon, is an Earth colony, described as having a somewhat cold climate and being still economically dependent on Earth.

Omicron Persei (Atik)
 Futurama (1999), animated science fiction situation comedy set in the 31st century, created by Matt Groening. The Omicronians are large aliens from Omicron Persei 8, who often attack Earth. Located just over 1000 light-years from Earth, the Omicronians also receive and are fans of 20th-century television broadcasts from Earth. Omicron Persei 8 is also home to medicinal plants.

p Eridani (Gliese 66)
 Known Space (1964–), shared universe for books and stories by Larry Niven. The Pierin are a slave species of the Kzinti. At the time of their conquest, they occupied several planets near p Eridani.
 Revelation Space universe (2000–), novels and stories by Alastair Reynolds. p Eridani is the home star of the planet Ararat, a Pattern Juggler world. Ararat is a primary setting of the series novel Absolution Gap.

Phecda (Gamma Ursae Majoris)
 Frontier: Elite II (1993) and Frontier: First Encounters (1995), computer games written by David Braben et al. The star Phecda appears in the northern territories. It is a notoriously dangerous system swarming with pirates and freebooters.

Yu-Gi-Oh! Trading Card Game. Phecda is represented in the card, Fire Formation – Tenki.
Shin Megami Tensei: Devil Survivor 2. Phecda is represented as part of a group of extraterrestrial beings known as the Septentriones, appearing on Tuesday in the game as a boss.

Phi Ophiuchi (8 Ophiuchi)
 The Palace of Love (1967), novel by Jack Vance. Sarkovy, the single planet of this obscure star, is moist and cloudy; with an axis normal to the orbital plane, it knows no seasons. The surface lacks physiographical contrast; the characteristic features of the landscape are vast steppes across which nomads wander in their tall-wheeled wagons. From the abundant flora the notorious Sarkoy venefices (poison masters) leach and distill the poisons for which they are famous across the galaxy.

Phi Orionis (φ1 or φ2)
 Space Opera (1965), novel by Jack Vance. Home star of the planet Zade (Phi Orionis II), where the crew of the Phoebus performs Rossini's Barber of Seville. Vance does not specify whether the star is φ1 or φ2, which are about 900 light-years apart on a direct line from Earth.

Pi Canis Majoris
 Pi Canis Majoris is an ongoing feature in the plot of the Netflix series Another Life starring Katee Sackhoff. Notably, it is pictured in episode 9 of season 1.

Pistol Star (V4647 Sgr)
 The novel Icarus Down by James Bow (2016) is set on a colony world 25,000 light years from Earth, orbiting an extremely bright and hot star. The colony ship, the Icarus, appeared too close to that sun, and crashed. The planet is identified as V4647 Sgr-b. V4647 Sgr is one of the designations of the Pistol Star.

Polaris (Alpha Ursae Minoris)

 Flash Comics #1 et seq. (1940–), comic books in the DC Comics universe. Thanagar is a planet in the Polaris star system (sometimes the "Polaris Galaxy") that is the original home of the humanoid Thanagarian race, noted for the discovery of gravity-defying Nth metal. Thanagar is the home of the "Silver Age" version of Hawkman, who is able to fly using prosthetic wings of Nth metal.
 Showcase #17 et seq. (1958), comic books in the DC Comics universe. Rann is a planet in the Polaris star system whose capital city is Ranagar. Rann is most famous for being the adopted planet of the Earth explorer and hero Adam Strange and for its teleportation device called the Zeta Beam, which first brought him there.
 "Camera Bugged" (1989), episode #38 of the 1987 Teenage Mutant Ninja Turtles animated television series, written by Michael and Mark Edens. The Polarisoids (a pun on Polaroid cameras) are the most obnoxious tourists in the galaxy.
 Frontier: Elite II (1993) and Frontier: First Encounters (1995), computer games written by David Braben et al. Polaris is a distant (434 light-years from Earth) uninhabited system comprising many planets. In First Encounters, the player may visit Polaris to complete the game's major plotline.
 FreeSpace 2 (1999), combat simulation computer game designed by Dave Baranec et al., and published by Volition. Polaris is the capital system of the Neo-Terran Front during their rebellion against the Galactic Terran Vasudan Alliance.
 Escape Velocity Nova (2002), computer game developed and published by Ambrosia Software. Polaris is the name of a game faction that arose from a colony expedition that set out to settle systems beyond the star Polaris.
 Green Lantern vol. 4 #25 et seq. (2007), comic books in the DC Comics universe. Odym is a planet in the Polaris star system that is home to the Blue Lantern Corps, one of seven corps empowered by a specific color of the emotional spectrum within the DC Universe. The Blue Lanterns are powered by the emotion hope.
 Super Mario Galaxy (2007), video game by Nintendo in the Super Mario series. The character "Polari" is named after the star.
The 100 (2014 - 2020), a The CW science fiction television series, features a corporate orbital research station named "Polaris", whose name later becomes the basis for "Polis", the name given to the capital city of a major faction (the Coalition).
Control (video game) (2019), video game by Remedy Entertainment. The entity "Polaris" is named after the star.

Pollux (Beta Geminorum)
 "Who Mourns for Adonais?" (1967), episode of Star Trek: The Original Series written by Gilbert Ralston and Gene L. Coon. The starship Enterprise is approaching Pollux IV on a survey mission. Suddenly, a huge energy field in the shape of a glowing green hand materializes and seizes the Enterprise. An apparition who identifies himself as the god Apollo appears on the bridge and invites the crew down to the planet—an invitation they can't refuse. Kirk states that they might never get help as far out as Pollux, but other episodes of the series show that the location is centrally located within Federation space. Other novels and comics also depict locations on planets in the same system.
 Frontier: Elite II (1993) and Frontier: First Encounters (1995), computer games written by David Braben et al. Pollux has a single permanent settlement, primarily engaged in mining and refining operations.

Procyon (Alpha Canis Minoris)
 Tékumel (~1940–), novels and games by M. A. R. Barker. Procyon is the home sun of the Pé Chói, or Listeners.
 Viagens Interplanetarias (1949–1958; 1977–1992), series of novels and short stories written in two waves by L. Sprague de Camp. The Procyon system has three inhabited planets: Osiris, an arid world whose saurian inhabitants are sentimental, rapaciously capitalistic, and capable of mind control; Isis, inhabited by a species resembling a cross "between an elephant and a dachshund"; and Thoth, a wet planet whose natives are amoral and anarchic.
 Non-Stop (1958), novel by Brian Aldiss. A generation ship is returning from the newly colonized planet Procyon. Twenty-three generations ago, the ship suffered from a pandemic due to an alien amino acid in Procyon's water. Shipboard civilization broke down during the crisis and the crew has since devolved into a collection of primitive tribes having no idea they are on a starship.
 Seed of Light (1959), novel by Edmund Cooper. Commander Kepler of the starship Solarian has a prescient vision in which his crew visits a terrestrial planet orbiting Procyon in tidally locked rotation. They discover that the two cities in the planet's twilight zone have ended a five-thousand year war by destroying each other in a nuclear holocaust.
 A Gift from Earth (1968), Known Space novel written by Larry Niven. We Made It, a planet in orbit around Procyon A, got its name because the first colony ship there crash-landed (the natives are called "Crashlanders"). Gravity is about three-fifths that of Earth. The planet's rotational axis is parallel to the plane of its orbit (like Uranus), contributing to hypervelocity 1500 mph winds during half the planet's year that force the inhabitants to live underground.
 Justice League of America #140 et seq. (1977–), comic books in the DC Comics universe. The Manhunters are a race of extraterrestrial robots based on the planet Orinda in the Procyon system, the first attempt of the Guardians of the Universe to create an interstellar police force to combat evil all over the cosmos. After serving the Guardians for thousands of years, they have become obsessed with the act of "hunting" criminals—even at the expense of justice.
 The Godwhale (1974), novel by T. J. Bass. Procyon is the destination of a colonization starship, "Dever's Ark." For unspecified reasons the attempt to colonize a planet orbiting Procyon is unsuccessful and the starship returns to Earth. Triggered by an apparently unrelated radio signal, the starship falls into the ocean and its reentry pods containing plants, animals, and possibly humans are scattered around the planet. Among other effects, the starship returns marine life to the oceans that have been stripped bare by a ruthless human civilization numbering in the trillions.
 Terran Trade Authority (1978–1980), novels by Stewart Cowley. Procyon is orbited by three planets: Procyon II, named Sisyphus, is a barely habitable mining world.
 His Master's Voice (1983), English translation by Michael Kandel of the 1968 Polish language novel by Stanislaw Lem. It is a densely philosophical novel about an effort by scientists to decode, translate and understand an extraterrestrial transmission from Alpha Canis Minoris. The novel critically approaches humanity's intelligence and intentions in deciphering and truly comprehending a message from outer space.
 Star Control II (1992), computer game developed by Toys for Bob and published by Accolade. Procyon II is the homeworld of the Chenjesu species, and the adopted homeworld of the robotic Mmrnmhrm.  If the player performs certain actions, these species form a hybrid race that helps the protagonist reach the objective of the game.
 Frontier: Elite II (1993) and Frontier: First Encounters (1995), computer games written by David Braben et al. Procyon is represented as an uninhabited, worldless binary star system. Elite: Dangerous (2014), the sequel to the latter game, instead depicts Procyon as a densely populated system with four Earth analogs orbiting Procyon B, three of which were terraformed by humanity in the backstory.
 Escape Velocity Nova (2002), computer game developed and published by Ambrosia Software. The Procyon system begins the game uninhabited but is connected to four other systems. A minor mission string terraforms one of its planets into the world Nirvana, which subsequently becomes a major hub in Federation space.
 Life Probe (1983) and Procyon's Promise (1985), novels by Michael McCollum. The Life Probe, on its deceleration into our solar system, detected the 'wake' of a "faster-than-light" ship emanating from the Procyon system.
 Star Trek: Star Charts (2002), fictional reference book by Geoffrey Mandel. The Andorians are a fictional race of humanoid extraterrestrials created by D. C. Fontana for the Star Trek universe. According to Mandel's reference book they are native to the icy M-class moon Andoria (also called Andor), which orbits the blue, ringed gas giant Procyon VIII.
 Treasure Planet (2002), Disney animated film written by Ron Clements et al. and directed by Ron Clements and John Musker. Captain Amelia of the RLS Legacy says in introducing herself, "Late of a few run-ins with the Procyon Armada, nasty business, but I won't bore you with my scars."
 Treasure Planet: Battle at Procyon (2002), computer strategy game developed by Barking Dog Studios and published by Disney Interactive. The game is set five years after the events of the film Treasure Planet. In the game, the Terran Empire is on the cusp of a peace treaty with the Procyon Empire and the Procyon fleet figures prominently, but no battle actually takes place at Procyon (a fact noted in the end credits).
 "Azati Prime" (2004), episode of Star Trek: Enterprise written by Rick Berman, Brannon Braga, and Manny Coto. The Procyon system is the location of the far-future Battle of Procyon V, a Federation victory in a war against an alien species known as the Sphere Builders. In 2153, Captain Jonathan Archer is sent 400 years forward in time to witness the battle from the USS Enterprise, NCC-1701-J.
 Supreme Commander (2007), developed by Chris Taylor at Gas Powered Games and published by THQ. In the Cybran campaign QAI, the enormously intelligent and powerful AI responsible for spreading the quantum virus, resides on hardware located in the Procyon system. This planetary system forms part of the Cybran Nation, a race of man-machine symbionts.
 Halo Wars (2009), video game set in the Halo universe, developed by Ensemble Studios and published by Microsoft Game Studios. Part of the game is set on the planet Arcadia, a fictional world in the Procyon planetary system.
 Starflight – The Lost Colony (2010), computer game in the Starflight universe developed and published by Electronic Arts. The planet Procya in the Procyon system is the homeworld of the Empire's worst enemy, the Procyon Expanse.
  Procyon, along with other stars in the Winter Triangle, Summer Triangle, and Winter Hexagon, comprise parts of the Tellarknight archetype in the Yu-Gi-Oh! Trading Card Game.  Together with the other defining vertices of the Winter Triangle, Sirius and Betelgeuse, "Satellarknight Procyon" is released in the New Challengers Booster Pack (2014), with Stellarknight Triverr representing the Winter Triangle itself.
 "The Piccadilly Interval" (1963), short story by Edmund Cooper. Passengers from London underground train are teleported to a planet of the Procyon star.

Proxima Centauri (Alpha Centauri C)
Proxima Centauri, part of a triple star system with Alpha Centauri A and B, is the nearest-known star to the Solar System. Even though habitation may be difficult because it is a flare star, a disproportionate number of early fiction titles are dedicated to Proxima Centauri, as the destination of humanity's first interstellar voyage. A planet in Proxima Centauri's habitable zone was detected in Aug 2016, and a ringed super-earth in 2019, far further away.
 Proxima Centauri (1935), short story by Murray Leinster. Earth's first starship, the Adastra, navigates to Proxima Centauri. The star has two planets: Centauri I, homeworld of the Centaurians—mobile, carnivorous plants that look on the crew as a desirable food source (and eat most of them); and earthlike Centauri II, abandoned ages past by the Centaurians and ripe for human colonization, once the Centaurian homeworld can be destroyed.
 "Universe" (1941) and "Common Sense" (1941), novellas by Robert A. Heinlein assembled into the fixup Orphans of the Sky (1963). The generation ship Vanguard, originally destined for Proxima Centauri, is cruising pilotless through interstellar space after a failed mutiny that killed the piloting officers. The descendants of the surviving crew have forgotten the purpose and nature of their ship and lapsed into a pre-technological farming culture laden with superstition.
 "The Variable Man" (1953), novelette by Philip K. Dick published in the collection The Variable Man (1957). Time-travel refugee Thomas Cole is recruited into an interstellar war being waged between burgeoning humanity and the Centaurians, scions of an aging and corrupt empire who rule from a planet orbiting the star Proxima Centauri. Cole lends his atavistic troubleshooting expertise to the war effort, with unanticipated results.
 The Magellanic Cloud (1955), Polish language novel (Obłok Magellana) by Stanislaw Lem. Several hundred colonists leave the Earth in the Gaia, bound for the Alpha Centauri system. They find signs of life on a barren marslike planet of Proxima Centauri, which lead them to an advanced civilization orbiting Alpha Centauri.
 The World in Peril (1955–1956), third radio series in the BBC Radio science fiction programme Journey into Space, written and produced by Charles Chilton. In the last episode (#20) of the series, the Martian Invasion Fleet, including many humans who have led unhappy lives on Earth, leaves for Proxima Centauri to establish a perfect civilization, free from persecution, hunger, misgovernment and war.
 The Three Stigmata of Palmer Eldritch (1965), novel by Philip K. Dick. The Proxima Centauri planetary system ("Prox system") is the source of an alien hallucinogen which Palmer Eldritch markets as Chew-Z. His business rivals arrange to have him killed, suspecting at the same time that Eldritch has become a god in the "Prox" system.
 Captive Universe (1969), novel by Harry Harrison. Another generation ship story; this time the pre-technological culture that has forgotten its true provenance is Aztec, and the restless young man who discovers the truth is named Chimal. The ship is the hollowed-out asteroid Eros, and the destination is Proxima Centauri. As with many authors of "first voyage" stories, Harrison has selected this nearest star to the Earth as the target of the mission. Strangely, the crew has been deliberately programmed into a mental state of medieval monkishness, and the colonists into a pre-Columbian tribalism. This novel provides an outstanding example of the use of myth in science fiction.

 Moscow-Cassiopeia (1973), Soviet film (Москва-Кассиопея) written by Isai Kuznetsov and Avenir Zak, and directed by Richard Viktorov. From the depths of space the Earth could hear the radio signals of intelligent beings from the star Alpha Cassiopeiae (Shedar). A group of students is recruited as the crew of the starship Dawn to search out the source of the transmissions. On the way, they pass the star Proxima Centauri.
 Star Maidens (1976), ITV network television series written by Eric Paice et al. and directed by James Gatward et al. Two male slaves escape from the matriarchal planet Medusa and are pursued to Earth by Medusan security forces. When the Medusans fail to recapture the two, they take a pair of terran hostages—a man and a woman—back with them instead. Subsequent episodes explore the fish-out-of-water goings-on on both worlds. Medusa, originally in orbit around Proxima Centauri, was cast adrift in the galaxy as a rogue planet (see graphic) when it was ejected from the system by a giant comet.
 Terran Trade Authority (1978–1980), novels by Stewart Cowley. Proxima Centauri is the home system of the Proximans, adversaries of Terrans and Alphans during the Proximan War.
 Cerberus: The Proxima Centauri Campaign (1979), strategy board game designed by Stephen V. Cole and published by Task Force Games. Humanity tries to colonize a world in the Proxima Centauri system that is already inhabited by aliens from Tau Ceti. The game revolves around ground combat between the rival races. Note that Proxima Centauri, at 4.24 light-years from Earth, is about 13.37 ly from Tau-Ceti, giving us the claim of proximity while leaving the right of prior possession to the Cetians.
 Frontier: Elite II (1993), Frontier: First Encounters (1995) and Elite: Dangerous (2014), computer games written by David Braben et al. Players are able to visit Proxima Centauri and enter a space station in the Alpha Centauri system. In Elite: Dangerous, Proxima Centauri is 0.22ly from the rest of the Alpha Centauri system, and is only accessible via in-system supercruise (which can take over an hour of real time) as opposed to a hyperspace jump.
 Babylon 5 (1993–1998), television series developed and written by J. Michael Straczynski. Proxima III is an Earth Alliance colony. When Earth becomes a dictatorship in 2260, Proxima III secedes from the Alliance, is besieged by Alliance warships, and finally rescued by Captain John Sheridan in late 2261.
 Event Horizon (1997), film written by Philip Eisner and directed by Paul W. S. Anderson. A rescue vessel is dispatched to recover the Event Horizon, a starship that had disappeared seven years before, during its maiden voyage to Proxima Centauri. It was using an experimental gravity drive to generate an artificial black hole that could bridge two points in spacetime. Without warning, the Event Horizon entered another dimension, described as one of "pure chaos, pure evil"—perhaps Hell itself.
 Far Gate (2001), video game developed by Super X Studios and Thrushwave Technology, and published by Microïds. The New Terran Dynasty exiles a group of colonists to Proxima Centauri after forging data to suggest that the planet Vesta, orbiting the star, is habitable. After a series of misunderstandings, the colonists are aided by the Nue-Guyen, a race of aliens who terraform the uninhabitable world for them.
 Destroy All Humans! (2005), video game developed by Pandemic Studios and published by THQ. Furons are the enemies of humanity, and they resemble the ufological Greys morphology—except for their mouths full of sharp teeth. They come from the planet Furon in the Proxima Centauri system.
 Proxima (2007), Spanish film written and directed by Carlos Atanes. Tony, the proprietor of a failing video store, listens to a strange CD, and his life is changed forever. He feels bizarre sensations, and he meets surprising people who assure him they know how to escape an alien fleet approaching Earth. Finally, Tony starts off for Proxima Centauri, but what he finds there is not exactly what he had expected.
 "The Waters of Mars" (2009), special of the British television series Doctor Who, written by Russell T Davies and Phil Ford, and directed by Graeme Harper. Proxima Centauri is the first destination of mankind when faster-than-light travel is developed. This plot element of Waters is a quite typical example of the science fiction "custom" of sending first interstellar voyages to the nearest of stars.
 Proxima (2013), a book by Stephen Baxter, a future history documenting the pioneer settlement of a planet orbiting Proxima Centauri.
 Ascension (2014), television miniseries from Philip Levens and Adrian A. Cruz, has it as the ultimate destination of the 1960s-era generation ship USS Ascension.
"Yaana" (2014), novel by S. L. Bhyrappa. This novel has a story of two astronauts (a man and a woman) traveling in a spaceship to Proxima Centauri, the closest star to the earth which is around 4–6 light years away. The journey takes several decades. The novel focuses on scientific problems and human relationships when they are away from the earth. While generating oxygen and food on the spaceship the technical problems, the other issues are giving birth to children there and nurturing them.
Traitor (2019), a novel by J. F. R. Coates. Proxima Centauri is home to a breakaway human faction, the Centauran Governance of Planets. Their home planet, Centaura, orbits close to Proxima Centauri. The planet experiences long days through a slow orbit, and is protected by an electromagnetic shield from the strong radiation emitted from the nearby star. Non-sapient life has evolved on the planet.

Psi Cassiopeiae
 In the 1854 science fiction novel Star, French author C. I. Defontenay wrote of 9-foot tall blue-haired immortal humanoids that inhabited Psi Cassiopeia.

Regulus (Alpha Leonis)
 Tékumel (~1940–), novels and games by M. A. R. Barker. Regulus is the home sun of the Vléshga, or Shunned/Stinking Ones.
 BattleTech (1984), wargame and related products launched by The FASA Corporation. Regulus is the capital system of the Duchy of Regulus, one of the founding states of the Free Worlds League.
 Frontier: Elite II (1993) and Frontier: First Encounters (1995), computer games written by David Braben et al. In the games, Regulus has no permanent settlements, although minor mining operations do occur within the Regulus system.
 Babylon 5 (1993–1998), television series developed and written by J. Michael Straczynski. The Regulus system is the location of the Earth Alliance's first extrasolar colony.
 Descent: FreeSpace – The Great War (1998), computer game developed by Volition and published by Interplay Entertainment. Regulus is the greatest stronghold of the Neo-Terran Front during their rebellion against the Galactic Terran Vasudan Alliance.
 "Kir'Shara" (2004), episode of Star Trek: Enterprise written by Mike Sussman. Regulus is the staging area for a massive pre-emptive strike by the Vulcan High Command on Andoria, based on specious intelligence suggesting that the Andorian Imperial Command is planning to adapt their vessels with powerful Xindi weaponry.
 "Fairy Tail" (2011) Celestial Spirit Leo the Lion's attacks are based on the star, because it is the brightest star in the Leo constellation, which are what all celestial spirits are based on.
 Harry Potter (1997–2007), fantasy novels written by J. K. Rowling. Regulus Black was a Death Eater.  Members of the Black family were commonly named after stars.
 "Dark Matter" (2015-2017), some episodes take place on "Regulus-12", a space station in Regulus system.

 

Rigel (Beta Orionis)
 The Lensman Series (1934–48), novels by E. E. "Doc" Smith. The Lensman series takes place on many different worlds over a vast sweep of space. The ancient supercivilization of the Arisians, originators of the "lens", initiates a breeding program for potential godlike heroes, the Lensmen, on four worlds of high potential, including the Earth and Rigel IV—the latter a hot, high-gravity world. "L2" (Second-Stage Lensman) Kimball Kinnison is the product of the program on Earth, and L2 Tregonsee is the Rigellian. Smith's work is strongly identified with the beginnings of US pulp science fiction as a separate marketing genre, and did much to define its essential territory, galactic space, featuring many planets such as those orbiting Rigel. The Lensman series is considered far superior to Smith's Skylark series.
 The Stars My Destination (1956), classic science fiction novel (titled Tiger! Tiger! in the UK) written by Alfred Bester, and doubly inspired by Alexandre Dumas' The Count of Monte Cristo and William Blake's poem "The Tyger". After his apotheosis in the burning cathedral, the legendary Gully Foyle teleports stark naked to the vicinity of several stars, including Rigel: "burning blue-white, five hundred and forty light years from earth, ten thousand times more luminous than the sun, a cauldron of energy circled by thirty-seven massive planets ..." The interstellar "jaunting" sequence is typical of Bester's signature pyrotechnics, his quick successions of hard, bright images, and mingled images of decay and new life.
 Adaptation (1960), novelette by Mack Reynolds appearing in Astounding Science Fiction. Humanity is obsessed with the goal of colonizing every single one of the galaxy's millions of earthlike worlds, and they know how to do it: On each even semi-habitable new planet, a colony of a mere few hundred brave souls is seeded; inevitably they quickly revert to barbarism; more often than not, after a standard thousand years, they somehow adapt and develop a civilization peculiarly suited to their strange new home. Such is the case for Rigel, whose planets Genoa and Texcoco are "all but unbelievably Earthlike. Almost all [the] flora and fauna have been adaptable. Certainly [our] race has been." After the requisite millennium, protagonist Amschel Mayer is sent in to take charge as a godlike interloper, to mold the young societies as he sees fit ... Reynolds' Adaptation, like "most of his later works, is unashamedly didactic, although not doctrinaire." (Reynolds was a lifelong socialist.)
  On Venus, Have We Got a Rabbi! (1974) by William Tenn: the most astounding delegates to the Interstellar Neozionist Congress convened on Venus come from the fourth planet of Rigel and tell their story.

Ross catalog of stars
The Ross stars in this list (but not all stars in the Ross catalog) are red dwarfs, and they are among the closest stars to the Solar System. They were catalogued beginning in 1926 by the American astronomer Frank Elmore Ross, and some of them are still widely known by the catalog number he gave them (for one that is not, see Ross 780). The stars listed below, despite their faint magnitudes (all numerically greater than 10), have attracted the attention of authors and game developers interested in fiction depicting the earliest stages of humanity's expansion into the galaxy. At least one of the Ross stars has been confirmed to possess multiple extrasolar planets as of 2013.

Ross 128 (FI Virginis)
 Across the Sea of Suns (1984), novel in the Galactic Center Saga by Gregory Benford. Ross 128 is the home system of the Ganymede-like moon Pocks. An amphibious alien race hides under the moon's ten-kilometer thick mantle of ice from a Berserker-like autonomous killing machine known as a Watcher, in orbit around Pocks.
 Enigma (1986), second installment of The Trigon Disunity series of novels by Michael P. Kube-McDowell. Ross 128 is discovered to be the site of a long-abandoned colony of humans that was established 50,000 years in the past.
 Frontier: Elite II (1993) and Frontier: First Encounters (1995), computer games written by David Braben et al. An inner planet of Ross 128 is the site of a prison colony. Game players need a special permit to visit the system or get fined by the police for permit violation otherwise.
 Descent: FreeSpace – The Great War (1998), computer game developed by Volition and published by Interplay Entertainment. The Ross 128 system is the location of the first known encounter between the Galactic Terran Alliance and their antagonists, the Shivans.
 "Galactic North" (1999), short story by Alastair Reynolds, also published in the collection Galactic North (2006). The Ross 128 system is the source of an outbreak of self-replicating machines known as greenfly, which become a major threat to life in the galaxy (compare Ross 128: "Across the Sea of Suns" above).
 FTL:2448 (1982), roleplaying game written by Richard Tucholka and published by Tri Tac Games, Ross 128 is the home of the second human colony around another world. The world was called Frenner II after the Frenner Corporation.
 War of the Worlds (2019), science fiction TV series. An unidentified signal is picked up from the vicinity of Ross 128. The signal is described by experts as proof of intelligent alien life. Within days, earth suffers an alien invasion resulting in the destruction of most human life. The series follows the few remaining survivors as they attempt to figure out why earth was attacked.

Ross 154 (V1216 Sagittarii)
 Downbelow Station (1981) and other Alliance-Union universe works, novels by C. J. Cherryh. Ross 154 is the site of Glory Station, one of the stations on the "Great Circle" chain of space stations that terminates at Pell Station in the Tau Ceti system.
 DOOM (1993), video game developed and published by id Software. In the original treatment of the game, designer Tom Hall wanted Doom to take place on the planet Tei Tenga of Ross 154, on which the UAAF (United Aerospace Armed Forces) had two military research bases.
 Frontier: Elite II (1993) and Frontier: First Encounters (1995), computer games written by David Braben et al. The moon Merlin, an ice world similar to our own Europa, orbits a gas giant planet of Ross 154 named Aster. Its primary export is fish, harvested from the liquid ocean that exists below the icy crust. Importing luxury goods from Sol and illegally exporting animal skins to Barnard's Star are both profitable enterprises. Ross 154 is the primary starting point of Frontier: Elite II.
 Terminal Velocity (1995), video game developed by Terminal Reality and published by 3D Realms. The planet Tei Tenga (taken from the early ideas for DOOM, as stated above) orbits this star.
 The Night's Dawn Trilogy (1996–1999), novels by Peter F. Hamilton: In 2611 a "terracompatible" planet, Felicity, was found in its orbit in 2123; as of 2611, its multi-ethnic population still struggles to find racial harmony, one of the main themes on planetary colonization in this novel set.
 Burn Notice (Season 3, Episode 5: Signals and Codes), Ross 154 is the home system of "The Guardians", friendly aliens discovered by the client, Spencer.
 Orlenok (Eaglet), SF short story by Valentina Zhuravleva, first published in Russian in 1961. Aella, a colonized planet of Ross 154, is the aim of a rescue expedition.

Ross 248 (HH Andromedae)
 Rimrunners (1989) and other Alliance-Union universe works, novels by C. J. Cherryh. Ross 248 is the site of Thule, one of the stations on the "Great Circle" chain of space stations that terminates at Pell Station in the Tau Ceti system.
 "Glacial" (2001), novella by Alastair Reynolds, also published in the collection Galactic North (2006). The ice planet Diadem orbits this star. The onetime location of a since-failed American colony, it is 100 years later explored by the Conjoiner faction as they flee from the war-torn Solar System. Diadem is a planetary sentient being that "thinks" using the transient chemical trails of ice-worms in its mantle much as the human brain uses electro-chemical impulses.

Ross 780 (Gliese 876)
Items in this section refer to the star as Ross 780. For references to Gliese 876, see the separate section in this article. As of 2013, it has been confirmed that four (nonfictional) extrasolar planets orbit the star.
 Downbelow Station (1981) and other Alliance-Union universe works, novels by C. J. Cherryh. Ross 780 is the site of Russell's Station, a space station founded after the discovery of Pell's World in the Tau Ceti system. It is rendered uninhabitable by the Company Fleet before the events of Downbelow Station and many refugees from it arrive there at the start of the novel. It is later repaired and joins the Union.

Rukbat (Alpha Sagittarii)
 Dragonriders of Pern (1967 to 2012), series of novels and short stories by Anne McCaffrey. Rukbat is the star around which orbits Pern, the focal planet of the series. Higher life on Pern is derived from human civilization on Earth but includes dragons bio-engineered by the people of Pern to help protect the planet from Thread, a space-borne spore that originates within Rukbat's Solar System and voraciously consumes organic material. (In a mischaracterization, possibly intentional by the author, Rukbat is described in the series as a class G yellow star whereas in reality it is a class B blue dwarf.)
 Caitlin R. Kiernan's short story "Hydrarguros" (2010). The main character's boyfriend mentions Rukbat while the two are stargazing. Other events in the story suggest that the star might be the source of the phenomenon afflicting the main character.

Sheliak (Beta Lyrae)

Beta Lyrae is an eclipsing binary system (see animation) in which mass is being transferred from the brighter primary to the more massive secondary star in a presumably spectacular accretion disc. Because of this, it has inspired the imaginations of artists and authors alike across the years; Chesley Bonestell (1964), for example, painted a famously evocative, influential (and imaginative) canvas depicting Beta Lyrae as it traces a vast fiery spiral across the black sky of some jagged airless world.
 I lived in the year 3000 (1959), German-language novel (Ich lebte im Jahr 3000) by Heinz Gartmann as by Werner Wehr, with an introduction by German aerospace engineer Eugen Sänger. A journalist who is an outspoken sceptic on the possibility of time dilation accidentally goes on a subjective 10-year voyage to Sheliak, and discovers that the phenomenon is real indeed.
 Moon Pilot (1962), film written by Maurice Tombragel based on the novel Starfire by Robert Buckner, and directed by James Neilson. Astronaut Richmond Talbot is to make the first crewed flight around the moon. He is approached by Lyrae, a beautiful "foreign" woman who offers a formula to protect his spacecraft from a hidden flaw. She turns out to be a friendly alien from the planet Beta Lyrae; she stows away, he flies her to the moon. During the mission the two lovers perplex mission control by joining in a love song about the distant planet.
 The Green World (1963), novellete by Hal Clement first published in If and collected in The Moon is Hell!/The Green World. The planet Viridis, with its very dangerous fauna, orbits Beta Lyrae. 
 "The Soft Weapon" (1967), Known Space short story by Larry Niven published in the collection Neutron Star (1968). Two humans and their Puppeteer companion are ambushed on the planet Cue Ball of the Beta Lyrae system by Kzin pirates. In "Soft Weapon", Niven's description of Beta Lyrae is actually a meticulous retelling of the details of Bonestell's painting rather than any kind of portrayal of the Beta Lyrae system itself, which is now understood to look quite different; Cue Ball is nothing like Bonestell's planet.
 The Slaver Weapon (1973), episode of Star Trek: The Animated Series written by Larry Niven. In this version of the Slaver story set on an ice planet orbiting Beta Lyrae, the trio of spacefarers comprises Mr. Spock, Uhura, and Sulu.
 The Tail of Beta Lyrae (1983), computer game developed by Philip Price and published by Datamost. The game player takes the role of a wing commander assigned to the Beta Quadrant. Alien invaders have occupied mining colonies in the asteroid belt of the Beta Lyrae planetary system.
 Frontier: Elite II (1993) and Frontier: First Encounters (1995), computer games written by David Braben et al. Beta Lyrae has an unusual property: If the system is entered, the game crashes as a result of its computer code being unable to handle the mechanics of a contact binary. Only advanced players can observe this, since Beta Lyrae is so distant from the core systems that only powerful ships can get there, although a bug in the game can be exploited to get there more easily. In Elite: Dangerous (2014), the system can be visited, but the contact binary nature of the system is not faithfully represented.
 Marathon (1994), video game developed and published by Bungie. The generation ship Marathon is served by several artificial intelligences, including the "utilities" AI Durandal, who is of doubtful loyalty. Durandal dreams of voyaging to Beta Lyrae to see the contact binary's spectacular accretion disk.

Sigma Draconis (Alsafi)
 "Spock's Brain" (1966), episode of Star Trek: The Original Series written by Gene L. Coon as by Lee Cronin and directed by Marc Daniels. The Sigma Draconis system contains three inhabited planets: Sigma Draconis III, IV and VI. Sigma Draconis III is home to a medieval civilization, while the inhabitants of Sigma Draconis IV have reached a post-industrial level. The crew of the Enterprise does battle on Sigma Draconis VI, an ice-blasted world populated by primitive Morgs (who before their fall were more scientifically advanced than the Federation), in a campaign to recover the kidnapped brain of Mr. Spock.
 Bedlam Planet (1968), novel by John Brunner. A crew of astronauts runs into trouble on a planet of the Sigma Draconis system—they are infected by a local virus that destroys their capacity to assimilate vitamin C. Odd things begin to happen to their mentalities.
 The Byworlder (1971), novel by Poul Anderson. An extraterrestrial from the Sigma Draconis system has come into orbit around Earth. People attempting to communicate with him become part of an international struggle to gain control over his advanced space ship.
 Starforce: Alpha Centauri (1974), board game designed by Redmond Simonsen and published by Simulation Publications. Humanity is reaching out into local interstellar space, and making first contact (and war) with a number of alien species. In the Sigma Draconis system, 18.8 light-years distant, they encounter the L'Chal Dah, an advanced spacefaring race.
 Total Eclipse (1974), novel by John Brunner. The starship Stellaris undertakes several missions to Sigma Draconis III in the years from 2020 to 2028.
 Sigma Draconis is one of the six star systems in the Star Trader board game (1982) set in SPI's Universe role-playing game. The others are Beta Hydri, Epsilon Eridani, Gamma Leporis, Mu Herculis, and Tau Ceti.
 A Woman of the Iron People (1991), novel by Eleanor Arnason. The novel tells a story of first contact between peoples from a future Earth and the intelligent, furred race inhabiting an unnamed planet of Sigma Draconis. Chinese explorer Li Lixia lands on the planet, befriends the native woman Nia, and slowly masters the intricacies of the local culture. The second part of the novel deals with the question of intervention: Various factions of humans disagree as to how much they should interfere in events onworld.
 Dune II: The Building of a Dynasty (1992), computer game developed by Westwood Studios (Brett Sperry et al.) and published by Virgin Interactive. The game revolves around an interstellar struggle between the Houses of Atreides, Harkonnen, and Ordos. House Ordos does not appear in any of the Dune novels, but it does in several Dune computer games. The Ordos are mercenary; they care for nothing, save power and wealth. Their home planet, featured in the Ordos House emblem, is Sigma Draconis IV.
 Honor Harrington (1993–), series of novels by David Weber. Located in the Sigma Draconis system, Beowulf is the oldest human colony, having been founded almost two thousand years before the events in the Honor Harrington saga. Beowulf, an important member of the Solarian League, derives a measure of prosperity from the proximity of a wormhole junction that makes the planet a major trading partner of the Star Kingdom of Manticore. Recent developments are prompting Beowulf to secede from the Solarian League.
 Outpost (1994), the computer game by Sierra On-Line featured Sigma Draconis as a playable system, and Sigma Draconis III was depicted on the box.
 The Apocalypse Troll (1999), novel by David Weber. Protagonist Ludmilla Leonovna is descended from the Sigma Draconis First Wave—inhabitants of Sigma Draconis IV who, surviving a biological attack by the violently xenophobic Kanga, acquired a heritable symbiote which lent them an array of enhanced physical and mental powers. She must travel back in time to the Earth of the twenty-first century to do battle against a time-shifted Kanga task force and its Troll (a psychopathic cyborg shock-trooper) who have been assigned the back-time mission of preemptively destroying the human race.
 Rollback (2007), novel written by Robert J. Sawyer. Sarah Halifax is an astronomer who long ago translated the first transmission received from an extraterrestrial source: Sigma Draconis. Now, 38 years later, the 87-year-old protagonist is again called upon when a second set of signals arrives. In the story, the importance of her task leads to rejuvenation ("rollback") treatments for herself and her longtime husband—but they only work for him.
 To Sleep in a Sea of Stars (2020), novel by Christopher Paolini. The story begins in the Sigma Draconis system which has three orbiting planets.  The second is a massive gas giant named Zeus. Humans are able to live on one of the many moons of Zeus, named Adrasteia.

Sigma Sculptoris
Referenced in the fictional short story "Three-legged Joe" by author Jack Vance as being orbited by 14 planets, the outermost of which was named Odfars and inhabited by a single alien for which the story is named.

Sirius (Alpha Canis Majoris)
 True History (c. second cent CE), travel tale by the Greek-speaking Syrian author Lucian of Samosata. The novel mentions alien Sirian acorn-dogs ("dog-faced men fighting on winged acorns"), who help him carry the day.
 "Micromégas" (1752), short story by Voltaire. The tale recounts the visit to Earth of a giant from a world circling the star Sirius.
 Seed of Light (1959), novel by Edmund Cooper. The tale concerns the voyage of a generation starship to the Sirius system.
 The Starlight Barking (1967), the sequel to The Hundred and One Dalmatians. Sirius, lord of the Dog Star, sets off the events of the novel.
 The Sirian Experiments (1980), third novel in the Canopus in Argos series by literature Nobelist Doris Lessing. The Sirian Empire, centred in the Sirius star system, has advanced technology that makes its citizens effectively immortal and sophisticated machines that do almost everything for them.
 V (1983–1985), miniseries and regular television series created by Kenneth Johnson. Carnivorous reptilian humanoids from Sirius IV invade the Earth.
 Half Asleep in Frog Pajamas (1994), novel by Tom Robbins. The plot refers to the Sirius mysteries and the mythology surrounding the Dogon people of Mali in west Africa.
From Mars to Sirius (2005), concept album by Gojira (band). The plot of the album revolves around an interstallar quest which ends with the secret to salvation being learnt from beings near the fictional star Sirius C in the Sirius system.
Horizon Forbidden West (2022), video game by Guerrilla Games. The main antagonists of the game the Far Zeniths come from a human colony in the Sirius system.

Spica (Alpha Virginis)
 In the second book of Edmond Hamilton's Starwolf series (1968), it is mentioned that one of the characters lost his family while away on a mission to Spica.
 In Antares Passage (1987), second book of the Antares Series trilogy by Michael McCollum. Spica is discovered to be the transport hub of the Ryall Hegemony. Most of the events of the following book, Antares Victory, take place in the Spica system.
 Pushing Ice (2005), novel written by Alastair Reynolds. Saturn's moon Janus unexpectedly veers out of its orbit and bolts from the Solar System, pursued by explorer Bella Lind in her space ship the Rockhopper. On approaching its quarry, the vessel gets helplessly entrained by the inertialess drive that propels the great orb—in reality a huge alien spacecraft—and the ship's crew, in the realization that they can never return to Earth, eke out a rough settlement on the moon's surface, willy nilly joining in its voyage to the star Spica. Their ultimate destination there turns out to be the Spica Structure: An immense artifact orbiting the star, it is a fasces-like bundle of O'Neill cylinders, each one with "the internal surface area of fifty thousand Earths; a million Earth's worth in the entire structure...the tube could be three light-minutes [~50 million km] long".
Spica serves as the titular inspiration in the manga series Twin Spica, as the star is of great personal importance to the protagonist, who is a high school student in an astronaut training program. The symbolism associated with Spica crops up frequently during the manga, both as a distant goal, and as something that is more than it seems to the casual observer (being a binary star) much like the protagonist. 
 In Goddess in Granite, a short story by Robert Young, the main planet of Alpha Virginis has a gynecomorphous mountain range called the Virgin. It is a plateau about ten thousand feet above sea level, and it looks exactly like a titanic sculpture of a nude woman in repose with lakes for eyes.

T Coronae Borealis
 In the story Viewpoints in Thomas W. Hamilton's anthology "The Mountain of Long Eyes" (2012) the planet Shayol in orbit around T Coronae Borealis is used by the United States as a prison planet.

Tau Ceti
 In C. J. Cherryh's Alliance/Union universe, Tau Ceti, known as Pell's Star, is orbited by Pell's World, which is orbited by Downbelow Station.
 The Tau Ceti system is a main setting in Andy Weir's 2021 novel, Project Hail Mary.
 The protagonist the 1968 science fiction film Barbarella crash-lands on Tau Ceti's 16th planet.
 In 2300 AD (1986), role-playing game published by the Game Designers' Workshop. Kwantung (Tau Ceti II) is a temperate garden-like world harboring the Manchurian colony Changpai and the Mexican colony Nuevo Angeles. The Tau Ceti system sits astride the main access route to the Latin Systems.
 In Ursula K. Le Guin's The Dispossessed, Urras and Anarres are a double planet orbiting the star Tau Ceti.
 In Larry Niven's known space series, the planet Plateau, which is the main setting for the novel A Gift From Earth, is in orbit around Tau Ceti.
 In Isaac Asimov's The Robots of Dawn, the planet Aurora is in Tau Ceti's orbit
 Tau Ceti was the destination of the spaceship "Earthling" in the 1966 novel Destination: Void, by Frank Herbert. At the time of the novel's publication the existence of exoplanets around Tau Ceti were unknown. According to the plot of the story, the choice of Tau Ceti required there to be no habitable planets.
 In Dan Simmons's Hyperion novels, Tau Ceti Center, also known as TC², was the administrative capital of the Hegemony.
 Kim Stanley Robinson's Aurora follows a generation ship to the Tau Ceti system.
 In Harry Turtledove's Worldwar series of novels, the invading aliens called "The Race" are native to a planet orbiting Tau Ceti, which they call "Home". Human astronauts visit this planet in the final book, Homeward Bound (2004).
 Ten thousand years before the events of Tamsyn Muir's Locked Tomb science fiction/fantasy series, a group of multibillionaires abandon a dying Earth and flee to Tau Ceti.
The Tau Star System is the original home of the Death Busters in the manga and the Sailor Moon Crystal (2016): (episodes and chapters "Act 30 Infinity 4 Haruka & Michiru – Sailor Uranus & Sailor Neptune", "Act 32 Infinity 6 Three Sailor Guardians", "Act 37 Infinity 11 Infinite – Judgement", and "Act 38 Infinity 12 – Infinite – Journey"), and the original series of Sailor Moon (1995): (episodes "Believe in Love: Ami the Kindhearted Guardian", "The Coming Terror of Darkness: Struggle of the Eight Guardians", and "The Shinning Shooting Star: Saturn and the Messiah").

Tau Coronae Borealis
In Star Trek: Deep Space Nine (episodes "The Nagus", "Prophet Motive" and "Profit and Lace"), according to the Star Trek: Star Charts, on the star chart United Federation of Planets I, the Hupyrians (a humanoid species native to either the Alpha or Beta Quadrant) were from the Hupyria (Tau Coronae Borealis) system. Both the primary and the secondary were K-type stars. This system was located in the Alpha Quadrant.

Tau Cygni
 "The Ensigns of Command" (1989), episode of Star Trek: The Next Generation written by Melinda M. Snodgrass. The Enterprise crew receives an ultimatum from the enigmatic Sheliak race: Within four days evacuate the human colony from Tau Cygni V, which the aliens intend to colonize. The crew of the Enterprise use a combination of intimidation and diplomacy to resolve the crisis.

Theta Centauri (Menkent)
 Starman Jones (1953), novel by Robert A. Heinlein. To launch his brilliant career in space, farmhand Max Jones signs on to the Asgard with forged papers. The starship's first stop on his first voyage out is Garson's Planet, which "possesses the meager virtue of being least unpleasant" of Theta Centauri's 13 planets. It is a cold world with a burdensome surface gravity of 1.25 g, and a methane atmosphere that forces human inhabitants to live under domes. On the plus side, there are no less than six plotted "Horst congruencies" nearby, which makes the planet an interstellar cross-roads (compare Sigma Draconis: Beowulf above).

Theta Hydrae
 In the Star Trek expanded universe, Star Trek Star Charts: The Complete Atlas of Star Trek shows Theta Hydrae as being located within the borders of the Klingon Empire, with the native name Gorath (originally referred to in the Star Trek: Voyager episode "Day of Honor"). Star Trek Online, which based its overworld map on Star Charts, further identifies the Theta Hydrae system as having one marginally habitable planet, which is the location of a ground PVP arena and some of the territorial holdings of the House of Torg.

Theta Pegasi (Biham)
 One of two possible stars that are home of Planet Vortex in Ecco the Dolphin.

Theta Serpentis
 Theta Serpentis AB was referenced in the series finale of Marvel's Agents of S.H.I.E.L.D. as Alya, the name of Leopold Fitz and Jemma Simmons' daughter, as well as the star system that they took refuge by prior to the beginning of season 7.

Theta Ursae Majoris
 The Armies of Memory (2006), fourth in the series of four Thousand Cultures novels by John Barnes. In this novel Theta Ursae Majoris is orbited by the planet Addams, home to 102 cultures, which has lost contact with Earth. Protagonist Giraut Leones discovers that the planet was overwhelmed by an alien AI force that killed almost all the inhabitants and plundered their brains for memories and experiences.

TRAPPIST-1
 TerraGenesis (2016) features TRAPPIST-1 and its seven planets as terraforming candidates. In the game, the TRAPPIST-1 system was previously inhabited on all seven planets by an ancient civilization that has long since disappeared. All that remains of these ancient aliens is a mysterious terraforming machine called the Tresuunak, which has been scattered throughout the solar system and must be pieced together over the course of the campaign. TRAPPIST-1 can be seen in the background while players terraform its orbiting planets.

Unukalhai (Alpha Serpentis)
 Tékumel (~1940– ), novels and games by M. A. R. Barker. Unukalhai is the home sun of the Hegléth, or Swamp Folk.

UV Ceti (Luyten 726–8)
Luyten 726–8 is a binary star system: The component Luyten 726-8A is a red dwarf star with the variable designation BL Ceti, and Luyten 726-8B is a red dwarf with the alternate designation UV Ceti. The latter is the prototype for the class of flare stars, and it goes through fairly extreme changes of brightness: For instance, in 1952, its brightness increased by 75 times in only 20 seconds. None of the items below pretend that UV Ceti is orbited by habitable worlds.
 A Gift from Earth (1968), Known Space novel by Larry Niven. The colony world Plateau in the Tau Ceti system (11.9 light-years from Earth) lives by a rigorous code: All crimes are punishable by involuntary organ harvesting, while organ transplants are reserved to the benefit of the aristocracy. A robotic Bussard ramjet arrives from Earth, bearing a gift that will upset the unstable social balance on Plateau. But before that ... "8.3 light-years from Sol, almost directly between Sol and Tau Ceti, lie the twin red dwarf stars L726-8. Their main distinction is that they are the stars of smallest mass known to man. Yet they are heavy enough to have collected a faint envelope of gas. The ramrobot braked heavily as her ramscoop plowed through the fringes of that envelope." The relative proximity of Tau Ceti to the Earth (with a turnaround point at UV Ceti) is an important plot element in the novel, enabling Plateau to be isolated from the mother planet, and yet still close enough to receive occasional cargoes via ramjet.
 Downbelow Station (1981) and other Alliance-Union universe works, novels by C. J. Cherryh. UV Ceti is the site of Eldorado Station, one of the stations on the "Great Circle" chain of space stations that terminates at Pell Station in the Tau Ceti system.
 Timemaster (1992), novel by Robert L. Forward. A billionaire makes a six-year journey to the Barnard's Star system (6 light-years away) to open a wormhole in 2049. Later, a wormhole is opened between Earth and UV Ceti, at a distance of 8.7 light-years.

Van Maanen's Star (Gliese 35)
 A World Out of Time (1970), novel by Larry Niven. Protagonist Jerome Branch Corbell, cryogenically frozen in 1970, is revived in 2190 by an oppressive "State". He is arbitrarily selected to be the pilot and sole passenger of a Bussard ramjet, whose mission is to find and seed suitable planets as the first step in terraforming them for human colonization. The first planetary system on his itinerary is Van Maanen's Star. However, disgusted with The State, Corbell hijacks the ship and takes it to the center of the galaxy.
 Downbelow Station (1981) and other Alliance-Union universe works, novels by C. J. Cherryh. Van Maanen's Star is the site of Mariner, a space station founded after the discovery of Pell's World in the Tau Ceti system. It later joins the Union.
 Frontier: Elite II (1993), Frontier: First Encounters (1995), and Elite: Dangerous (2014), computer games written by David Braben et al. The Van Maanen's planetary system is the home of a radical religious sect that believes in suffering as the key to salvation. Mining is done without machines, and any surplus money that is not needed to satisfy basic requirements like oxygen, food and water is burned in a sacred ceremony. The system is only accessible with a special permit.  Due to the banning of ordinary trade items, Van Maanen's Star is a haven for smugglers.

 

Vega (Alpha Lyrae)
 Cities in Flight, (1955–1962), series of novels by James Blish. The Vega system is home to a civilization Blish names the Vegan Tyranny, which is blocking mankind's expansion into the galaxy. To fulfill their manifest destiny, men must defeat the Tyranny. The series' reflection of recent (from the vantage of 1955) earthly events, and the fascistic nature of the Vegan Tyranny, exhibit Blish's pessimistic view of the cyclic nature of history, as influenced by his reading of Spengler's The Decline of the West. Blish later recycled these ideas in his novelization of "Tomorrow is Yesterday" (1967), an episode of Star Trek: The Original Series.
 The Stars My Destination (1956), classic science fiction novel (titled Tiger! Tiger! in the UK) written by Alfred Bester. After his apotheosis in the burning cathedral, the legendary Gully Foyle teleports stark naked to the vicinity of several stars, including Vega: "Vega in Lyra ... burning bluer than Rigel, planetless, but encircled by swarms of blazing comets whose gaseous trails scintillated across the blue-black firmament ..." The interstellar "jaunting" sequence is typical of Bester's signature pyrotechnics, his quick successions of hard, bright images, and mingled images of decay and new life.
 Andromeda: A Space Age Tale (1959), English translation by George Hanna of the Russian language novel by Ivan Efremov. The Earth of the far future is a communist utopia, nonetheless able to send no more than a few infrequent space ships to the nearest star systems, since interstellar travel is limited by the speed of light. One of these near neighbors is Vega. The Earth expedition which reaches the Vega system finds it devoid of life. The Hour of the Bull (1968), the sequel to Andromeda, confronts its 'communist utopia' with a 'capitalist dystopia' in a structure similar to that subsequently used by Ursula K. Le Guin in The Dispossessed (1974).
 Agent of Vega (1960), fixup written by James H. Schmitz from stories originally appearing in Astounding Science Fiction. In the far future, humans are building the Confederacy of Vega to replace the fallen Empire of Earth. The new empire includes mutated humans as well as non-humans. The enemies of the Confederacy are also a mix of men (not to mention competent women) and aliens in a space opera setting that features Vega's Zone Agents. Conflict between the league and its adversaries involves both physical and telepathic weapons.
 This Immortal (1966). novel by Roger Zelazny. In this post-apocalyptic novel, Arts Commissioner Conrad Nomikos—who may or may not be immortal, and who may or may not be a god—assumes the irksome task of escorting a Vegan grandee around the ruins of Earth, which is a popular tourist destination for those among the blue-skinned aliens with a hankering for primal thrills. The masterfully manipulative "immortal" isn't the only one with secrets, however; the Vegan harbors dark secrets of his own, and Earth-liberation rebels are trying to kill him. "Conrad Nomikos ... resembles Herakles—whose labors the plot of the novel covertly replicates—but is certainly both the Hero of a Thousand Faces and the Trickster who mocks the high road of myth..."
 Contact (1985), novel written by Carl Sagan with unacknowledged assistance from Ann Druyan (see also the film Contact below). SETI researchers detect a message from an extraterrestrial intelligence—a transmitter array in orbit around the star Vega. As signal hunter Ellie Arroway breathlessly proclaims to a colleague over the telephone: "Yes, Vega is smack in the middle of the field of view. And we’re getting what looks like prime number pulses…" After an arduous decoding process, Ellie and her colleagues discover and implement the plans for a wormhole transport device that carries five explorers to the center of the galaxy. There they speak at length with supernal sentiences, but can bring back no proof of the contact—so that when they return home nobody believes their experiences.
 Have Spacesuit, Will Travel (1958), young-adult novel written by Robert Heinlein. Two teenagers are kidnapped by an alien invasion's advance party, only to escape with the assistance of a fellow prisoner from the Vega system. Having summoned assistance, their rescuers take them to Vega 5 for medical care and further adventures.

Wolf 359 (CN Leonis)

Wolf 359 is a red dwarf of apparent magnitude 13.5 and thus can only be seen with a large telescope. However, at approximately 7.8 light-years away it is the seventh-closest stellar system to the Sun; only the brown dwarfs WISE 0855−0714 and Luhman 16, as well as Barnard's Star and the three components of the Alpha Centauri system are known to be closer. It is a flare star, so in reality habitation may be difficult.

 In Proposal by L. Sprague de Camp, published in the November 1952 issue of Startling Stories, aliens from the first planet of Wolf 359 visit the Earth.
 The Space Pioneers (1953), novel in the Tom Corbett, Space Cadet franchise originated by Carey Rockwell. Corbett is in training at the Space Academy to become a member of the elite Solar Guard. The action of the novel takes place at the Academy, aboard the training ship Polaris, and on alien worlds, both within the Solar System and in orbit around nearby stars—specifically on Roald, a planet circling Wolf 359.
 The short story "The Outcasts" by George H. Smith (1958) takes place in the Wolf 359 system. It has two inhabited planets: Asgard and Olympia.
 "Wolf 359" (1964), episode of The Outer Limits television series, written by Seeleg Lester. To test the feasibility of colonizing Dundee Planet in the Wolf 359 system, scientist Jonathan Meridith creates a miniature time-accelerated simulacrum of the planet in his laboratory. When a mysterious lifeform swiftly evolves, Meredith becomes alarmed at its potential. In his final report he writes, "Final report, Dundee Planet, star system Wolf 359. The experiment is finished. My planet is destroyed. My recommendation to the Dundee Foundation: Change the planet selected. It's not a place we can land our spacemen, but the project is feasible..."
 Captive Universe (1969), novel by Harry Harrison. Another generation ship story; this time the pre-technological culture that has forgotten its true provenance is Aztec, and the restless young man who discovers the truth is named Chimal. The ship is the hollowed-out asteroid Eros, and the destination is Wolf 359, selected after the original choice of Proxima Centauri was abandoned.
 The Dark Side of the Sun (1976), novel by Terry Pratchett. The story is set in a portion of our galaxy populated by exactly 52 different sentient species. All of these species, humanity among them, have evolved in the last five million years, and all of them have evolved in a spherical volume of space only a few dozen light-years across centered on Wolf 359. The rest of the galaxy is sterile.
 "The Best of Both Worlds" (1990), double episode of Star Trek: The Next Generation written by Michael Piller. The Battle of Wolf 359, the subject of the second episode, is a pivotal confrontation between the Borg and a defensive Federation fleet in 2367, in which a single Borg cube obliterates a substantial fleet of 39 Federation ships. The battle and its aftermath are significant historical events in the fictional history of the Star Trek franchise. The battle appears in greater detail in the Star Trek: Deep Space Nine pilot episode "Emissary" (1993); it is shown again in Star Trek: First Contact in a flashback sequence, is recounted again by the ex-Borg character Seven of Nine in the Star Trek: Voyager episode "Infinite Regress" (1998), and is talked about at length by Capt. Liam Shaw in Star Trek: Picard (season 3) episode "No Win Scenario" (2023).
 Frontier: Elite II (1993), Frontier: First Encounters (1995), and Elite:Dangerous (2014) computer games written by David Braben et al. Wolf 359 is an industrial and mining colony in these games.
 Terminal Velocity (1995), video game developed by Terminal Reality and published by 3D Realms. The game has three episodes, the first of which is distributed as shareware. Each episode features three different worlds, making a total of nine levels. The third mission, to destroy the spaceship Moon Dagger, is set in the Wolf 359 planetary system.
 Descent: FreeSpace – The Great War (1998), computer game developed by Volition and published by Interplay Entertainment. As a kind of in-game payback for failing a mission, the unsuccessful player is given a throw-away assignment with little chance of augmenting his score: The player's character is assigned to fly support for an unimportant mission in the "remote" Wolf 359 system (remote from the War theater, not from the Earth!)
 Chindi (2002), Priscilla Hutchins novel by Jack McDevitt. Possibly alien satellites of unknown origin have been discovered orbiting various planets of the Solar System, including the Earth. Hutch's crew sets out to find who placed them there and why. In the course of the mission, the lost ship Venture is found in the Wolf 359 system.
 Escape Velocity Nova (2002), computer game developed and published by Ambrosia Software. The Federation's Bureau of Internal Investigation—the secret police—has its interstellar headquarters on the planet New England in the Wolf 359 system.
 There Will Be Dragons (2003), first in the series of four Council Wars novels by John Ringo. In this series, humanity inhabits two main worlds: the Earth and a planet in the Wolf 359 system. Civilization is in a state of stagnant decline as men dream away their days in luxury under the care of an omnipotent nanny-AI. Revolutionaries act to shatter this crippling system, and they plunge the worlds into a new Dark Age, complete with medieval-style warfare.
 Sword of the Stars (2006), computer game developed by Kerberos Productions and published by Paradox Interactive. In the game the player chooses one of six races to form an interstellar empire and conquer the galaxy. Key to winning the game's space battles are advanced military technologies, and the game provides the means to "research" them. Character Blasky Yao Hsiang's "research pod" travels in the direction of Wolf 359 on its first subspace journey.
 "Who's Afraid of Wolf 359?" (2008), short story by Ken MacLeod. After running afoul of Security on a space station, the unnamed protagonist is coerced into accepting a dangerous assignment: finding out what happened to an experimental colony orbiting Wolf 359.
 Troy Rising (2010–2011), trilogy of military science fiction novels by John Ringo. The Earth is found by aliens arriving through a jumpgate. The first arrivals, the Glatun are friendly traders, but the next species of aliens to arrive, the Horvath, demand all of Earth's Platinum-group and other heavy metals production.  One human, Tyler Vernon, manages to enlist the aid of the friendly aliens to help Earth's resistance forces free humanity from the oppressive yoke of the Horvath.  With the newfound support from the Glatun, Tyler and his corporation, Apollo Mining, use the portal to travel to the star system Wolf 359, where they build a space-elevator in orbit around a relatively small gas giant. The lower end of the space elevator is deep in the atmosphere of the gas giant and "mines" helium-3 from its atmosphere. The Helium-3 isotope is used as fuel by both mankind's newly built space fleet and the friendly Glatun. Since Wolf 359 is a flare star, the books go into some of the difficulties of shielding the newly constructed gas mine from Wolf's flares and eruptions.
 Wolf 359 (2015–2017), a fiction podcast about a crew of astronauts working under the organization Goddard Futuristics. The crew undergoes many unusual and oftentimes upsetting circumstances, discovering the unpalatable truth about their mission, the company, and the star they orbit around, Wolf 359.

Xi Puppis
 Star King (1964), "Demon Princes" novel by Jack Vance. Over drinks, protagonist Kirth Gersen is explaining to lovely Pallis Atwrode the origin of the humanoid race of Star Kings. One theory has it that the same vanished race who "carved Monument Cliff on Xi Puppis X" kidnapped a tribe of Neanderthals long ago and removed them to the Star Kings' homeworld Ghnarumen, there to serve as an experimental evolutionary template for the highly adaptable but still rudimentary native life forms.

Zeta Aquilae (Okab)
 Descent II (1996), video game developed by Parallax Software and published by Interplay Entertainment. The first four levels of the game are set in mining installations in this star system.

Zeta Ceti (Baten Kaitos)
 Baten Kaitos Eternal Wings and the Lost Ocean  and Baten Kaitos Origins, part of the Baten Kaitos franchise on the Nintendo GameCube published by Monolith Soft.

Zeta Doradus
In the novels in the Halo series, Zeta Doradus is the home of the Onyx shield world, first appearing in Halo: Ghosts of Onyx. The system makes appearances in several later novels featuring the shield world.

Zeta Draconis (Aldhibah)
 Star Control II (1992), computer game developed by Toys for Bob and published by Accolade. Zeta Draconis I is a home to the Aqua Helix, an ancient device worshipped as a sacred relic by the Thraddash. The player must find some way to get around the Thraddash fleet guarding it in order to acquire the Helix, which is necessary to progress.

Zeta Ophiuchi
 In Eric Brown's novel Helix, Zeta Ophiuchi is the destination of the colony ship Lovelock and the location of the Helix.

Zeta Persei (Menkib)
 Star Control II (1992), computer game developed by Toys for Bob and published by Accolade. Zeta Persei I is the homeworld of the Druuge and the Central Trade World of their Crimson Corporation, where the player must go to do business with them.

Zeta Piscium
 Appears as heavenly spirit turned demon in 16th century chinese novel Journey To The West.

Zeta Reticuli
 Alien (1979), film written by Dan O'Bannon and Ronald Shusett, and directed by Ridley Scott. The spaceship Nostromo receives a mysterious transmission from a nearby planetoid in or near the ζ2 Reticuli system. It sends an expedition to the surface where they find a derelict alien spacecraft. No name is given for the planetoid in the first movie; by the second, Aliens, it has been named LB-426 or LV-426. Comic books and other apocryphal materials sometimes refer to it as Acheron.
 Forty Thousand in Gehenna (1983), Alliance-Union universe novel by C. J. Cherryh. A group of 42,363 Union colonists are dispatched to set up a base on the habitable planet Gehenna II in the Zeta Reticuli system. Unknown to the settlers, their mission is designed to fail; they are deliberately abandoned to create long-term problems for the rival Alliance.
 Space: Above and Beyond (1995–1996), television series created by Glen Morgan and James Wong. In early 2063, the Chigs wage war against humanity, launching what appears to be an unprovoked first-strike against two human colonies. Zeta Reticuli is the home system of celestial bodies 2063F (the Chig homeworld), 2064R (its moon), Anvil, and Ixion.
 Silicon Embrace (1996), novel written by John Shirley. During a second American Civil War soon, a group of journalists is caught up in a plot hatched by obscure government entities and an alien race from Zeta Reticuli. The Reticulans have been secretly influencing the course of human evolution for thousands of years.
 Seven Days (1998–2001), television series created by Christopher and Zachary Crowe. A secret NSA department has developed a time machine based on alien technology and a fuel source ("element 115") found in the wreckage of a spacecraft from Zeta Reticuli near Roswell, New Mexico. The show's "Backstep Sphere" can send one operative seven days back in time to avert disasters.
 Yu-Gi-Oh! (1999), original trading card game published by Konami. It is based on the fictional game of Duel Monsters created by manga artist Kazuki Takahashi. One of the collectible cards is "Zeta Reticulant", featuring an alien from the ζ Ret system; when played, it summons Extraterrestrial Biological Entity tokens.
 Prometheus (2012), film written by Jon Spaihts and Damon Lindelof, and directed by Ridley Scott. In 2089, two scientists discover a star map among the remnants of several ancient Earth cultures. Following the map, the spaceship Prometheus and its crew arrive on Christmas Day 2093 at the moon LV-223 in the Zeta Reticuli system where they find an abandoned bioweapons installation of a technologically advanced humanoid race and encounter a threat to Earth.
 Space Raiders, a British corn snack, lists Zeta Reticuli IX as the home planet of the Space Raider Secoid aliens depicted on the front of the packet.
 "Exo-Politics", a song by British band Muse, uses the lyrics "When the Zetas fill the skies" referring to extraterrestrials from the Zeta Reticuli system orbiting and controlling the Earth.

Zeta Tucanae
 The Cunning Blood (2005), novel by Jeff Duntemann. Zeta Tucanae I (Longshadow) is only marginally habitable, given its proximity to the star and its tidally locked rotation. Zeta Tucanae II is an earthlike world that would be a nice place to visit, but is used by Earth as a prison planet—whence its name Hell'''.
 Babylon 5'' (1993–1998) TV series by J. Michael Straczynski. Zeta Tucanae III is also known as Centauri Prime, the homeworld of the Centauri Republic.

See also

Planets in science fiction
Lists of stars

Notes and references

Notes

References

 
 
Lists of astronomical locations in fiction